

520001–520100 

|-bgcolor=#d6d6d6
| 520001 ||  || — || December 2, 2008 || Mount Lemmon || Mount Lemmon Survey ||  || align=right | 2.6 km || 
|-id=002 bgcolor=#E9E9E9
| 520002 ||  || — || October 2, 2013 || Kitt Peak || Spacewatch ||  || align=right | 1.9 km || 
|-id=003 bgcolor=#E9E9E9
| 520003 ||  || — || October 2, 2013 || Kitt Peak || Spacewatch ||  || align=right | 1.2 km || 
|-id=004 bgcolor=#d6d6d6
| 520004 ||  || — || September 12, 2013 || Mount Lemmon || Mount Lemmon Survey ||  || align=right | 2.4 km || 
|-id=005 bgcolor=#E9E9E9
| 520005 ||  || — || April 14, 2011 || Mount Lemmon || Mount Lemmon Survey ||  || align=right | 1.8 km || 
|-id=006 bgcolor=#E9E9E9
| 520006 ||  || — || October 7, 2008 || Kitt Peak || Spacewatch ||  || align=right | 1.6 km || 
|-id=007 bgcolor=#E9E9E9
| 520007 ||  || — || October 23, 2004 || Kitt Peak || Spacewatch ||  || align=right | 2.3 km || 
|-id=008 bgcolor=#E9E9E9
| 520008 ||  || — || October 23, 2013 || Mount Lemmon || Mount Lemmon Survey ||  || align=right | 1.7 km || 
|-id=009 bgcolor=#E9E9E9
| 520009 ||  || — || October 24, 2013 || Mount Lemmon || Mount Lemmon Survey ||  || align=right | 1.1 km || 
|-id=010 bgcolor=#E9E9E9
| 520010 ||  || — || December 18, 2009 || Kitt Peak || Spacewatch ||  || align=right | 1.5 km || 
|-id=011 bgcolor=#E9E9E9
| 520011 ||  || — || December 18, 2009 || Mount Lemmon || Mount Lemmon Survey ||  || align=right data-sort-value="0.97" | 970 m || 
|-id=012 bgcolor=#E9E9E9
| 520012 ||  || — || October 9, 2013 || Mount Lemmon || Mount Lemmon Survey ||  || align=right | 1.7 km || 
|-id=013 bgcolor=#d6d6d6
| 520013 ||  || — || September 28, 2003 || Kitt Peak || Spacewatch ||  || align=right | 1.9 km || 
|-id=014 bgcolor=#E9E9E9
| 520014 ||  || — || October 25, 2013 || Kitt Peak || Spacewatch ||  || align=right data-sort-value="0.89" | 890 m || 
|-id=015 bgcolor=#E9E9E9
| 520015 ||  || — || October 26, 2013 || Catalina || CSS ||  || align=right | 2.3 km || 
|-id=016 bgcolor=#E9E9E9
| 520016 ||  || — || October 26, 2013 || Kitt Peak || Spacewatch ||  || align=right | 1.1 km || 
|-id=017 bgcolor=#E9E9E9
| 520017 ||  || — || November 22, 2009 || Kitt Peak || Spacewatch ||  || align=right data-sort-value="0.76" | 760 m || 
|-id=018 bgcolor=#E9E9E9
| 520018 ||  || — || January 7, 2006 || Kitt Peak || Spacewatch ||  || align=right | 1.3 km || 
|-id=019 bgcolor=#E9E9E9
| 520019 ||  || — || September 5, 2008 || Kitt Peak || Spacewatch ||  || align=right | 1.9 km || 
|-id=020 bgcolor=#E9E9E9
| 520020 ||  || — || October 26, 2013 || Kitt Peak || Spacewatch ||  || align=right | 1.7 km || 
|-id=021 bgcolor=#d6d6d6
| 520021 ||  || — || November 1, 2008 || Mount Lemmon || Mount Lemmon Survey ||  || align=right | 2.3 km || 
|-id=022 bgcolor=#E9E9E9
| 520022 ||  || — || November 4, 2004 || Kitt Peak || Spacewatch ||  || align=right | 1.9 km || 
|-id=023 bgcolor=#E9E9E9
| 520023 ||  || — || November 9, 2009 || Kitt Peak || Spacewatch ||  || align=right | 1.2 km || 
|-id=024 bgcolor=#E9E9E9
| 520024 ||  || — || October 31, 2013 || Kitt Peak || Spacewatch ||  || align=right | 1.8 km || 
|-id=025 bgcolor=#E9E9E9
| 520025 ||  || — || April 19, 2007 || Kitt Peak || Spacewatch ||  || align=right | 1.0 km || 
|-id=026 bgcolor=#E9E9E9
| 520026 ||  || — || November 1, 2013 || Mount Lemmon || Mount Lemmon Survey ||  || align=right | 1.8 km || 
|-id=027 bgcolor=#d6d6d6
| 520027 ||  || — || November 1, 2013 || Kitt Peak || Spacewatch ||  || align=right | 3.5 km || 
|-id=028 bgcolor=#E9E9E9
| 520028 ||  || — || November 1, 2013 || Mount Lemmon || Mount Lemmon Survey ||  || align=right | 2.0 km || 
|-id=029 bgcolor=#E9E9E9
| 520029 ||  || — || November 2, 2013 || Kitt Peak || Spacewatch ||  || align=right | 1.1 km || 
|-id=030 bgcolor=#E9E9E9
| 520030 ||  || — || November 21, 2009 || Kitt Peak || Spacewatch ||  || align=right | 2.0 km || 
|-id=031 bgcolor=#d6d6d6
| 520031 ||  || — || September 9, 2007 || Kitt Peak || Spacewatch ||  || align=right | 2.8 km || 
|-id=032 bgcolor=#d6d6d6
| 520032 ||  || — || November 2, 2013 || Kitt Peak || Spacewatch ||  || align=right | 2.1 km || 
|-id=033 bgcolor=#E9E9E9
| 520033 ||  || — || November 2, 2013 || Mount Lemmon || Mount Lemmon Survey ||  || align=right | 2.4 km || 
|-id=034 bgcolor=#E9E9E9
| 520034 ||  || — || November 2, 2013 || Mount Lemmon || Mount Lemmon Survey ||  || align=right | 1.3 km || 
|-id=035 bgcolor=#E9E9E9
| 520035 ||  || — || September 3, 2008 || Kitt Peak || Spacewatch ||  || align=right | 1.7 km || 
|-id=036 bgcolor=#E9E9E9
| 520036 ||  || — || November 2, 2013 || Mount Lemmon || Mount Lemmon Survey ||  || align=right | 1.9 km || 
|-id=037 bgcolor=#E9E9E9
| 520037 ||  || — || November 6, 2013 || Haleakala || Pan-STARRS ||  || align=right | 1.3 km || 
|-id=038 bgcolor=#E9E9E9
| 520038 ||  || — || August 22, 2004 || Kitt Peak || Spacewatch ||  || align=right data-sort-value="0.85" | 850 m || 
|-id=039 bgcolor=#fefefe
| 520039 ||  || — || October 25, 2005 || Kitt Peak || Spacewatch ||  || align=right | 1.0 km || 
|-id=040 bgcolor=#E9E9E9
| 520040 ||  || — || November 8, 2013 || Mount Lemmon || Mount Lemmon Survey ||  || align=right | 1.2 km || 
|-id=041 bgcolor=#d6d6d6
| 520041 ||  || — || October 14, 2013 || Mount Lemmon || Mount Lemmon Survey ||  || align=right | 2.5 km || 
|-id=042 bgcolor=#E9E9E9
| 520042 ||  || — || December 21, 2008 || Catalina || CSS ||  || align=right | 2.5 km || 
|-id=043 bgcolor=#E9E9E9
| 520043 ||  || — || November 9, 2013 || Haleakala || Pan-STARRS ||  || align=right | 1.1 km || 
|-id=044 bgcolor=#d6d6d6
| 520044 ||  || — || September 11, 2007 || XuYi || PMO NEO ||  || align=right | 2.3 km || 
|-id=045 bgcolor=#E9E9E9
| 520045 ||  || — || September 3, 2008 || Kitt Peak || Spacewatch ||  || align=right | 1.4 km || 
|-id=046 bgcolor=#E9E9E9
| 520046 ||  || — || May 2, 2010 || WISE || WISE ||  || align=right | 2.0 km || 
|-id=047 bgcolor=#E9E9E9
| 520047 ||  || — || November 9, 2013 || Haleakala || Pan-STARRS ||  || align=right | 1.6 km || 
|-id=048 bgcolor=#d6d6d6
| 520048 ||  || — || November 21, 2008 || Kitt Peak || Spacewatch ||  || align=right | 2.8 km || 
|-id=049 bgcolor=#E9E9E9
| 520049 ||  || — || November 10, 2013 || Kitt Peak || Spacewatch ||  || align=right data-sort-value="0.81" | 810 m || 
|-id=050 bgcolor=#E9E9E9
| 520050 ||  || — || November 10, 2013 || Kitt Peak || Spacewatch ||  || align=right | 1.5 km || 
|-id=051 bgcolor=#E9E9E9
| 520051 ||  || — || November 9, 2004 || Catalina || CSS ||  || align=right | 1.7 km || 
|-id=052 bgcolor=#E9E9E9
| 520052 ||  || — || October 7, 2013 || Kitt Peak || Spacewatch ||  || align=right | 2.2 km || 
|-id=053 bgcolor=#E9E9E9
| 520053 ||  || — || September 26, 2008 || Mount Lemmon || Mount Lemmon Survey ||  || align=right | 1.5 km || 
|-id=054 bgcolor=#fefefe
| 520054 ||  || — || November 6, 2013 || Catalina || CSS ||  || align=right data-sort-value="0.91" | 910 m || 
|-id=055 bgcolor=#E9E9E9
| 520055 ||  || — || September 22, 2008 || Mount Lemmon || Mount Lemmon Survey ||  || align=right | 2.0 km || 
|-id=056 bgcolor=#E9E9E9
| 520056 ||  || — || November 12, 2013 || Mount Lemmon || Mount Lemmon Survey ||  || align=right data-sort-value="0.99" | 990 m || 
|-id=057 bgcolor=#d6d6d6
| 520057 ||  || — || August 10, 2012 || Kitt Peak || Spacewatch ||  || align=right | 3.0 km || 
|-id=058 bgcolor=#E9E9E9
| 520058 ||  || — || October 1, 2008 || Kitt Peak || Spacewatch ||  || align=right | 1.8 km || 
|-id=059 bgcolor=#E9E9E9
| 520059 ||  || — || November 26, 2013 || Mount Lemmon || Mount Lemmon Survey ||  || align=right | 2.0 km || 
|-id=060 bgcolor=#d6d6d6
| 520060 ||  || — || November 26, 2013 || Mount Lemmon || Mount Lemmon Survey ||  || align=right | 3.0 km || 
|-id=061 bgcolor=#d6d6d6
| 520061 ||  || — || November 26, 2013 || Haleakala || Pan-STARRS ||  || align=right | 3.2 km || 
|-id=062 bgcolor=#d6d6d6
| 520062 ||  || — || February 13, 2004 || Kitt Peak || Spacewatch ||  || align=right | 2.2 km || 
|-id=063 bgcolor=#E9E9E9
| 520063 ||  || — || January 7, 2010 || Kitt Peak || Spacewatch ||  || align=right | 1.1 km || 
|-id=064 bgcolor=#d6d6d6
| 520064 ||  || — || November 27, 2013 || Haleakala || Pan-STARRS ||  || align=right | 2.4 km || 
|-id=065 bgcolor=#E9E9E9
| 520065 ||  || — || November 27, 2013 || Haleakala || Pan-STARRS ||  || align=right | 2.2 km || 
|-id=066 bgcolor=#E9E9E9
| 520066 ||  || — || November 27, 2013 || Haleakala || Pan-STARRS ||  || align=right | 2.1 km || 
|-id=067 bgcolor=#fefefe
| 520067 ||  || — || November 28, 2013 || Mount Lemmon || Mount Lemmon Survey ||  || align=right data-sort-value="0.62" | 620 m || 
|-id=068 bgcolor=#E9E9E9
| 520068 ||  || — || September 22, 2008 || Kitt Peak || Spacewatch ||  || align=right | 2.1 km || 
|-id=069 bgcolor=#d6d6d6
| 520069 ||  || — || November 18, 2008 || Kitt Peak || Spacewatch ||  || align=right | 1.9 km || 
|-id=070 bgcolor=#E9E9E9
| 520070 ||  || — || November 28, 2013 || Kitt Peak || Spacewatch ||  || align=right | 1.8 km || 
|-id=071 bgcolor=#E9E9E9
| 520071 ||  || — || March 29, 2011 || Mount Lemmon || Mount Lemmon Survey ||  || align=right data-sort-value="0.91" | 910 m || 
|-id=072 bgcolor=#E9E9E9
| 520072 ||  || — || September 30, 2008 || Catalina || CSS ||  || align=right | 2.6 km || 
|-id=073 bgcolor=#E9E9E9
| 520073 ||  || — || September 4, 2008 || Kitt Peak || Spacewatch ||  || align=right | 1.2 km || 
|-id=074 bgcolor=#d6d6d6
| 520074 ||  || — || February 15, 2010 || Kitt Peak || Spacewatch ||  || align=right | 2.8 km || 
|-id=075 bgcolor=#E9E9E9
| 520075 ||  || — || November 29, 2013 || Haleakala || Pan-STARRS ||  || align=right | 2.4 km || 
|-id=076 bgcolor=#E9E9E9
| 520076 ||  || — || April 12, 2011 || Mount Lemmon || Mount Lemmon Survey ||  || align=right | 2.3 km || 
|-id=077 bgcolor=#E9E9E9
| 520077 ||  || — || April 28, 2011 || Mount Lemmon || Mount Lemmon Survey ||  || align=right | 1.8 km || 
|-id=078 bgcolor=#E9E9E9
| 520078 ||  || — || November 21, 2008 || Kitt Peak || Spacewatch ||  || align=right | 1.7 km || 
|-id=079 bgcolor=#d6d6d6
| 520079 ||  || — || December 4, 2013 || Haleakala || Pan-STARRS ||  || align=right | 2.9 km || 
|-id=080 bgcolor=#E9E9E9
| 520080 ||  || — || August 26, 2012 || Haleakala || Pan-STARRS ||  || align=right | 1.8 km || 
|-id=081 bgcolor=#d6d6d6
| 520081 ||  || — || December 6, 2013 || Haleakala || Pan-STARRS ||  || align=right | 2.5 km || 
|-id=082 bgcolor=#d6d6d6
| 520082 ||  || — || September 16, 2012 || Kitt Peak || Spacewatch ||  || align=right | 2.8 km || 
|-id=083 bgcolor=#E9E9E9
| 520083 ||  || — || November 10, 2013 || Mount Lemmon || Mount Lemmon Survey ||  || align=right | 1.8 km || 
|-id=084 bgcolor=#E9E9E9
| 520084 ||  || — || April 30, 2006 || Kitt Peak || Spacewatch ||  || align=right | 2.1 km || 
|-id=085 bgcolor=#E9E9E9
| 520085 ||  || — || December 11, 2013 || Mount Lemmon || Mount Lemmon Survey ||  || align=right | 1.6 km || 
|-id=086 bgcolor=#E9E9E9
| 520086 ||  || — || November 20, 2004 || Kitt Peak || Spacewatch ||  || align=right | 1.4 km || 
|-id=087 bgcolor=#E9E9E9
| 520087 ||  || — || December 12, 2013 || Haleakala || Pan-STARRS ||  || align=right | 1.5 km || 
|-id=088 bgcolor=#E9E9E9
| 520088 ||  || — || December 14, 2013 || Haleakala || Pan-STARRS ||  || align=right | 1.6 km || 
|-id=089 bgcolor=#E9E9E9
| 520089 ||  || — || March 19, 2010 || Kitt Peak || Spacewatch ||  || align=right | 2.2 km || 
|-id=090 bgcolor=#E9E9E9
| 520090 ||  || — || April 13, 2011 || Haleakala || Pan-STARRS ||  || align=right | 1.9 km || 
|-id=091 bgcolor=#E9E9E9
| 520091 ||  || — || December 4, 2013 || Haleakala || Pan-STARRS ||  || align=right data-sort-value="0.97" | 970 m || 
|-id=092 bgcolor=#E9E9E9
| 520092 ||  || — || January 8, 2010 || Kitt Peak || Spacewatch ||  || align=right | 1.7 km || 
|-id=093 bgcolor=#E9E9E9
| 520093 ||  || — || December 29, 2008 || Kitt Peak || Spacewatch ||  || align=right | 2.1 km || 
|-id=094 bgcolor=#E9E9E9
| 520094 ||  || — || October 10, 2008 || Kitt Peak || Spacewatch ||  || align=right | 1.2 km || 
|-id=095 bgcolor=#E9E9E9
| 520095 ||  || — || December 25, 2013 || Catalina || CSS ||  || align=right | 1.6 km || 
|-id=096 bgcolor=#E9E9E9
| 520096 ||  || — || December 25, 2013 || Mount Lemmon || Mount Lemmon Survey ||  || align=right | 2.0 km || 
|-id=097 bgcolor=#E9E9E9
| 520097 ||  || — || December 25, 2013 || Mount Lemmon || Mount Lemmon Survey ||  || align=right | 1.9 km || 
|-id=098 bgcolor=#d6d6d6
| 520098 ||  || — || December 26, 2013 || Mount Lemmon || Mount Lemmon Survey ||  || align=right | 2.4 km || 
|-id=099 bgcolor=#d6d6d6
| 520099 ||  || — || December 13, 2013 || Mount Lemmon || Mount Lemmon Survey ||  || align=right | 2.5 km || 
|-id=100 bgcolor=#d6d6d6
| 520100 ||  || — || December 27, 2013 || Mount Lemmon || Mount Lemmon Survey ||  || align=right | 2.9 km || 
|}

520101–520200 

|-bgcolor=#d6d6d6
| 520101 ||  || — || December 30, 2013 || Mount Lemmon || Mount Lemmon Survey ||  || align=right | 2.6 km || 
|-id=102 bgcolor=#E9E9E9
| 520102 ||  || — || December 30, 2013 || Mount Lemmon || Mount Lemmon Survey ||  || align=right | 1.0 km || 
|-id=103 bgcolor=#d6d6d6
| 520103 ||  || — || October 6, 2012 || Haleakala || Pan-STARRS ||  || align=right | 2.9 km || 
|-id=104 bgcolor=#d6d6d6
| 520104 ||  || — || January 31, 2009 || Kitt Peak || Spacewatch ||  || align=right | 2.4 km || 
|-id=105 bgcolor=#d6d6d6
| 520105 ||  || — || November 8, 2008 || Mount Lemmon || Mount Lemmon Survey ||  || align=right | 2.0 km || 
|-id=106 bgcolor=#d6d6d6
| 520106 ||  || — || May 8, 2006 || Kitt Peak || Spacewatch ||  || align=right | 2.7 km || 
|-id=107 bgcolor=#d6d6d6
| 520107 ||  || — || June 4, 2011 || Mount Lemmon || Mount Lemmon Survey ||  || align=right | 3.0 km || 
|-id=108 bgcolor=#fefefe
| 520108 ||  || — || September 5, 2008 || Kitt Peak || Spacewatch ||  || align=right data-sort-value="0.90" | 900 m || 
|-id=109 bgcolor=#d6d6d6
| 520109 ||  || — || November 28, 2013 || Mount Lemmon || Mount Lemmon Survey ||  || align=right | 2.0 km || 
|-id=110 bgcolor=#E9E9E9
| 520110 ||  || — || August 26, 2012 || Haleakala || Pan-STARRS ||  || align=right | 1.7 km || 
|-id=111 bgcolor=#fefefe
| 520111 ||  || — || April 30, 2011 || Mount Lemmon || Mount Lemmon Survey ||  || align=right data-sort-value="0.64" | 640 m || 
|-id=112 bgcolor=#E9E9E9
| 520112 ||  || — || March 20, 2010 || Mount Lemmon || Mount Lemmon Survey ||  || align=right | 1.6 km || 
|-id=113 bgcolor=#E9E9E9
| 520113 ||  || — || January 1, 2014 || Haleakala || Pan-STARRS ||  || align=right | 1.5 km || 
|-id=114 bgcolor=#d6d6d6
| 520114 ||  || — || August 28, 2011 || Haleakala || Pan-STARRS ||  || align=right | 3.5 km || 
|-id=115 bgcolor=#d6d6d6
| 520115 ||  || — || January 2, 2014 || Kitt Peak || Spacewatch ||  || align=right | 3.0 km || 
|-id=116 bgcolor=#d6d6d6
| 520116 ||  || — || January 3, 2014 || Kitt Peak || Spacewatch ||  || align=right | 2.4 km || 
|-id=117 bgcolor=#d6d6d6
| 520117 ||  || — || December 28, 2007 || Kitt Peak || Spacewatch ||  || align=right | 2.5 km || 
|-id=118 bgcolor=#d6d6d6
| 520118 ||  || — || June 25, 2010 || WISE || WISE ||  || align=right | 3.1 km || 
|-id=119 bgcolor=#fefefe
| 520119 ||  || — || March 13, 2007 || Kitt Peak || Spacewatch ||  || align=right data-sort-value="0.65" | 650 m || 
|-id=120 bgcolor=#E9E9E9
| 520120 ||  || — || October 10, 2012 || Mount Lemmon || Mount Lemmon Survey ||  || align=right | 2.1 km || 
|-id=121 bgcolor=#E9E9E9
| 520121 ||  || — || February 18, 2010 || Kitt Peak || Spacewatch ||  || align=right | 1.2 km || 
|-id=122 bgcolor=#E9E9E9
| 520122 ||  || — || February 14, 2010 || Kitt Peak || Spacewatch ||  || align=right | 1.5 km || 
|-id=123 bgcolor=#E9E9E9
| 520123 ||  || — || January 9, 2014 || Haleakala || Pan-STARRS ||  || align=right | 1.0 km || 
|-id=124 bgcolor=#E9E9E9
| 520124 ||  || — || January 19, 2005 || Kitt Peak || Spacewatch ||  || align=right | 1.5 km || 
|-id=125 bgcolor=#E9E9E9
| 520125 ||  || — || November 22, 2008 || Kitt Peak || Spacewatch ||  || align=right | 1.0 km || 
|-id=126 bgcolor=#E9E9E9
| 520126 ||  || — || January 12, 2014 || Mount Lemmon || Mount Lemmon Survey ||  || align=right | 1.5 km || 
|-id=127 bgcolor=#fefefe
| 520127 ||  || — || January 12, 2010 || Mount Lemmon || Mount Lemmon Survey ||  || align=right | 1.7 km || 
|-id=128 bgcolor=#d6d6d6
| 520128 ||  || — || October 15, 2012 || Kitt Peak || Spacewatch ||  || align=right | 2.8 km || 
|-id=129 bgcolor=#fefefe
| 520129 ||  || — || April 7, 2003 || Kitt Peak || Spacewatch ||  || align=right data-sort-value="0.78" | 780 m || 
|-id=130 bgcolor=#fefefe
| 520130 ||  || — || January 9, 2014 || Mount Lemmon || Mount Lemmon Survey ||  || align=right data-sort-value="0.88" | 880 m || 
|-id=131 bgcolor=#d6d6d6
| 520131 ||  || — || November 3, 2007 || Kitt Peak || Spacewatch ||  || align=right | 2.0 km || 
|-id=132 bgcolor=#E9E9E9
| 520132 ||  || — || January 24, 2014 || Haleakala || Pan-STARRS ||  || align=right | 1.2 km || 
|-id=133 bgcolor=#E9E9E9
| 520133 ||  || — || January 24, 2014 || Haleakala || Pan-STARRS ||  || align=right | 1.4 km || 
|-id=134 bgcolor=#d6d6d6
| 520134 ||  || — || October 10, 2012 || Haleakala || Pan-STARRS ||  || align=right | 2.9 km || 
|-id=135 bgcolor=#fefefe
| 520135 ||  || — || November 24, 2009 || Kitt Peak || Spacewatch ||  || align=right data-sort-value="0.68" | 680 m || 
|-id=136 bgcolor=#d6d6d6
| 520136 ||  || — || August 24, 2011 || Haleakala || Pan-STARRS ||  || align=right | 2.5 km || 
|-id=137 bgcolor=#E9E9E9
| 520137 ||  || — || January 9, 2014 || Mount Lemmon || Mount Lemmon Survey ||  || align=right | 1.4 km || 
|-id=138 bgcolor=#d6d6d6
| 520138 ||  || — || January 25, 2014 || Haleakala || Pan-STARRS ||  || align=right | 2.5 km || 
|-id=139 bgcolor=#d6d6d6
| 520139 ||  || — || August 2, 2011 || Haleakala || Pan-STARRS ||  || align=right | 3.6 km || 
|-id=140 bgcolor=#d6d6d6
| 520140 ||  || — || January 25, 2014 || Haleakala || Pan-STARRS ||  || align=right | 1.9 km || 
|-id=141 bgcolor=#d6d6d6
| 520141 ||  || — || March 18, 2004 || Kitt Peak || Spacewatch ||  || align=right | 3.1 km || 
|-id=142 bgcolor=#fefefe
| 520142 ||  || — || December 30, 2013 || Mount Lemmon || Mount Lemmon Survey ||  || align=right data-sort-value="0.76" | 760 m || 
|-id=143 bgcolor=#E9E9E9
| 520143 ||  || — || September 25, 2008 || Kitt Peak || Spacewatch ||  || align=right | 1.2 km || 
|-id=144 bgcolor=#fefefe
| 520144 ||  || — || May 7, 2011 || Kitt Peak || Spacewatch ||  || align=right data-sort-value="0.95" | 950 m || 
|-id=145 bgcolor=#E9E9E9
| 520145 ||  || — || October 10, 2012 || Mount Lemmon || Mount Lemmon Survey ||  || align=right | 1.2 km || 
|-id=146 bgcolor=#E9E9E9
| 520146 ||  || — || January 28, 2014 || Kitt Peak || Spacewatch ||  || align=right | 1.5 km || 
|-id=147 bgcolor=#E9E9E9
| 520147 ||  || — || September 13, 2007 || Kitt Peak || Spacewatch ||  || align=right | 1.4 km || 
|-id=148 bgcolor=#E9E9E9
| 520148 ||  || — || January 30, 2014 || Kitt Peak || Spacewatch ||  || align=right data-sort-value="0.87" | 870 m || 
|-id=149 bgcolor=#E9E9E9
| 520149 ||  || — || January 30, 2014 || Kitt Peak || Spacewatch ||  || align=right | 1.3 km || 
|-id=150 bgcolor=#E9E9E9
| 520150 ||  || — || October 19, 2012 || Mount Lemmon || Mount Lemmon Survey ||  || align=right | 2.4 km || 
|-id=151 bgcolor=#E9E9E9
| 520151 ||  || — || August 30, 2011 || Haleakala || Pan-STARRS ||  || align=right | 2.3 km || 
|-id=152 bgcolor=#d6d6d6
| 520152 ||  || — || October 22, 2012 || Kitt Peak || Spacewatch ||  || align=right | 2.7 km || 
|-id=153 bgcolor=#d6d6d6
| 520153 ||  || — || March 28, 2009 || Siding Spring || SSS ||  || align=right | 3.6 km || 
|-id=154 bgcolor=#E9E9E9
| 520154 ||  || — || September 15, 2007 || Mount Lemmon || Mount Lemmon Survey ||  || align=right | 1.8 km || 
|-id=155 bgcolor=#d6d6d6
| 520155 ||  || — || November 22, 2008 || Kitt Peak || Spacewatch ||  || align=right | 2.7 km || 
|-id=156 bgcolor=#E9E9E9
| 520156 ||  || — || October 27, 2008 || Mount Lemmon || Mount Lemmon Survey ||  || align=right data-sort-value="0.96" | 960 m || 
|-id=157 bgcolor=#E9E9E9
| 520157 ||  || — || April 9, 2010 || Mount Lemmon || Mount Lemmon Survey ||  || align=right | 1.1 km || 
|-id=158 bgcolor=#E9E9E9
| 520158 ||  || — || March 13, 2005 || Kitt Peak || Spacewatch ||  || align=right | 1.7 km || 
|-id=159 bgcolor=#E9E9E9
| 520159 ||  || — || January 29, 2014 || Kitt Peak || Spacewatch ||  || align=right | 1.1 km || 
|-id=160 bgcolor=#d6d6d6
| 520160 ||  || — || September 30, 2006 || Kitt Peak || Spacewatch ||  || align=right | 2.6 km || 
|-id=161 bgcolor=#E9E9E9
| 520161 ||  || — || February 9, 2014 || Haleakala || Pan-STARRS ||  || align=right | 1.9 km || 
|-id=162 bgcolor=#d6d6d6
| 520162 ||  || — || April 2, 2009 || Kitt Peak || Spacewatch ||  || align=right | 2.1 km || 
|-id=163 bgcolor=#d6d6d6
| 520163 ||  || — || August 27, 2011 || Haleakala || Pan-STARRS ||  || align=right | 2.3 km || 
|-id=164 bgcolor=#E9E9E9
| 520164 ||  || — || October 14, 2012 || Kitt Peak || Spacewatch ||  || align=right data-sort-value="0.94" | 940 m || 
|-id=165 bgcolor=#E9E9E9
| 520165 ||  || — || February 10, 2014 || Haleakala || Pan-STARRS ||  || align=right | 1.1 km || 
|-id=166 bgcolor=#fefefe
| 520166 ||  || — || September 6, 2008 || Kitt Peak || Spacewatch ||  || align=right data-sort-value="0.68" | 680 m || 
|-id=167 bgcolor=#d6d6d6
| 520167 ||  || — || December 19, 2007 || Kitt Peak || Spacewatch ||  || align=right | 2.7 km || 
|-id=168 bgcolor=#d6d6d6
| 520168 ||  || — || October 13, 2012 || Kitt Peak || Spacewatch ||  || align=right | 2.7 km || 
|-id=169 bgcolor=#E9E9E9
| 520169 ||  || — || December 31, 2008 || Kitt Peak || Spacewatch ||  || align=right | 1.5 km || 
|-id=170 bgcolor=#E9E9E9
| 520170 ||  || — || October 1, 2011 || Kitt Peak || Spacewatch ||  || align=right | 1.6 km || 
|-id=171 bgcolor=#E9E9E9
| 520171 ||  || — || January 6, 2013 || Kitt Peak || Spacewatch ||  || align=right | 2.7 km || 
|-id=172 bgcolor=#d6d6d6
| 520172 ||  || — || September 25, 2007 || Mount Lemmon || Mount Lemmon Survey ||  || align=right | 2.5 km || 
|-id=173 bgcolor=#E9E9E9
| 520173 ||  || — || February 11, 2014 || Mount Lemmon || Mount Lemmon Survey ||  || align=right data-sort-value="0.81" | 810 m || 
|-id=174 bgcolor=#E9E9E9
| 520174 ||  || — || September 11, 2007 || XuYi || PMO NEO ||  || align=right | 1.2 km || 
|-id=175 bgcolor=#E9E9E9
| 520175 ||  || — || February 11, 2014 || Mount Lemmon || Mount Lemmon Survey ||  || align=right | 1.2 km || 
|-id=176 bgcolor=#fefefe
| 520176 ||  || — || March 18, 2007 || Kitt Peak || Spacewatch || MAS || align=right data-sort-value="0.52" | 520 m || 
|-id=177 bgcolor=#E9E9E9
| 520177 ||  || — || November 8, 2008 || Mount Lemmon || Mount Lemmon Survey ||  || align=right | 1.3 km || 
|-id=178 bgcolor=#fefefe
| 520178 ||  || — || October 11, 2012 || Haleakala || Pan-STARRS ||  || align=right data-sort-value="0.74" | 740 m || 
|-id=179 bgcolor=#fefefe
| 520179 ||  || — || March 25, 2011 || Haleakala || Pan-STARRS ||  || align=right data-sort-value="0.83" | 830 m || 
|-id=180 bgcolor=#fefefe
| 520180 ||  || — || January 27, 2007 || Mount Lemmon || Mount Lemmon Survey ||  || align=right data-sort-value="0.64" | 640 m || 
|-id=181 bgcolor=#fefefe
| 520181 ||  || — || February 16, 2010 || Mount Lemmon || Mount Lemmon Survey || MAS || align=right data-sort-value="0.70" | 700 m || 
|-id=182 bgcolor=#fefefe
| 520182 ||  || — || February 26, 2014 || Haleakala || Pan-STARRS ||  || align=right data-sort-value="0.74" | 740 m || 
|-id=183 bgcolor=#fefefe
| 520183 ||  || — || February 26, 2014 || Haleakala || Pan-STARRS ||  || align=right data-sort-value="0.77" | 770 m || 
|-id=184 bgcolor=#fefefe
| 520184 ||  || — || April 17, 1999 || Kitt Peak || Spacewatch ||  || align=right data-sort-value="0.79" | 790 m || 
|-id=185 bgcolor=#fefefe
| 520185 ||  || — || October 8, 2012 || Haleakala || Pan-STARRS ||  || align=right data-sort-value="0.75" | 750 m || 
|-id=186 bgcolor=#fefefe
| 520186 ||  || — || April 25, 2003 || Kitt Peak || Spacewatch || NYS || align=right data-sort-value="0.53" | 530 m || 
|-id=187 bgcolor=#fefefe
| 520187 ||  || — || April 7, 2010 || WISE || WISE ||  || align=right data-sort-value="0.68" | 680 m || 
|-id=188 bgcolor=#fefefe
| 520188 ||  || — || February 9, 2014 || Haleakala || Pan-STARRS || NYS || align=right data-sort-value="0.58" | 580 m || 
|-id=189 bgcolor=#fefefe
| 520189 ||  || — || April 25, 2007 || Kitt Peak || Spacewatch ||  || align=right data-sort-value="0.67" | 670 m || 
|-id=190 bgcolor=#d6d6d6
| 520190 ||  || — || August 29, 2005 || Kitt Peak || Spacewatch ||  || align=right | 3.2 km || 
|-id=191 bgcolor=#fefefe
| 520191 ||  || — || April 5, 2003 || Kitt Peak || Spacewatch ||  || align=right data-sort-value="0.70" | 700 m || 
|-id=192 bgcolor=#E9E9E9
| 520192 ||  || — || February 28, 2014 || Haleakala || Pan-STARRS ||  || align=right | 1.7 km || 
|-id=193 bgcolor=#E9E9E9
| 520193 ||  || — || December 23, 2012 || Haleakala || Pan-STARRS ||  || align=right | 1.5 km || 
|-id=194 bgcolor=#d6d6d6
| 520194 ||  || — || March 26, 2009 || Kitt Peak || Spacewatch ||  || align=right | 2.5 km || 
|-id=195 bgcolor=#d6d6d6
| 520195 ||  || — || December 30, 2013 || Mount Lemmon || Mount Lemmon Survey ||  || align=right | 2.8 km || 
|-id=196 bgcolor=#d6d6d6
| 520196 ||  || — || September 18, 2011 || Mount Lemmon || Mount Lemmon Survey ||  || align=right | 2.0 km || 
|-id=197 bgcolor=#d6d6d6
| 520197 ||  || — || September 17, 2006 || Kitt Peak || Spacewatch ||  || align=right | 3.1 km || 
|-id=198 bgcolor=#E9E9E9
| 520198 ||  || — || October 24, 2008 || Kitt Peak || Spacewatch ||  || align=right | 1.2 km || 
|-id=199 bgcolor=#E9E9E9
| 520199 ||  || — || March 3, 2005 || Kitt Peak || Spacewatch ||  || align=right | 2.1 km || 
|-id=200 bgcolor=#E9E9E9
| 520200 ||  || — || April 9, 2010 || Mount Lemmon || Mount Lemmon Survey ||  || align=right | 1.4 km || 
|}

520201–520300 

|-bgcolor=#d6d6d6
| 520201 ||  || — || November 12, 2012 || Mount Lemmon || Mount Lemmon Survey ||  || align=right | 3.1 km || 
|-id=202 bgcolor=#d6d6d6
| 520202 ||  || — || February 24, 2014 || Haleakala || Pan-STARRS ||  || align=right | 3.0 km || 
|-id=203 bgcolor=#fefefe
| 520203 ||  || — || December 17, 2009 || Kitt Peak || Spacewatch ||  || align=right data-sort-value="0.77" | 770 m || 
|-id=204 bgcolor=#d6d6d6
| 520204 ||  || — || March 19, 2009 || Mount Lemmon || Mount Lemmon Survey ||  || align=right | 2.3 km || 
|-id=205 bgcolor=#d6d6d6
| 520205 ||  || — || February 9, 2008 || Mount Lemmon || Mount Lemmon Survey ||  || align=right | 3.7 km || 
|-id=206 bgcolor=#E9E9E9
| 520206 ||  || — || February 26, 2014 || Kitt Peak || Spacewatch ||  || align=right | 1.6 km || 
|-id=207 bgcolor=#fefefe
| 520207 ||  || — || September 6, 2008 || Kitt Peak || Spacewatch ||  || align=right data-sort-value="0.71" | 710 m || 
|-id=208 bgcolor=#E9E9E9
| 520208 ||  || — || January 23, 2014 || Mount Lemmon || Mount Lemmon Survey ||  || align=right | 1.9 km || 
|-id=209 bgcolor=#d6d6d6
| 520209 ||  || — || August 27, 2006 || Kitt Peak || Spacewatch ||  || align=right | 2.2 km || 
|-id=210 bgcolor=#E9E9E9
| 520210 ||  || — || November 9, 2007 || Kitt Peak || Spacewatch ||  || align=right | 1.7 km || 
|-id=211 bgcolor=#d6d6d6
| 520211 ||  || — || September 19, 2006 || Kitt Peak || Spacewatch ||  || align=right | 2.3 km || 
|-id=212 bgcolor=#E9E9E9
| 520212 ||  || — || February 20, 2009 || Kitt Peak || Spacewatch ||  || align=right | 2.1 km || 
|-id=213 bgcolor=#E9E9E9
| 520213 ||  || — || September 12, 2007 || Mount Lemmon || Mount Lemmon Survey ||  || align=right | 1.8 km || 
|-id=214 bgcolor=#d6d6d6
| 520214 ||  || — || January 18, 2008 || Mount Lemmon || Mount Lemmon Survey ||  || align=right | 2.5 km || 
|-id=215 bgcolor=#E9E9E9
| 520215 ||  || — || November 21, 2008 || Kitt Peak || Spacewatch ||  || align=right | 1.2 km || 
|-id=216 bgcolor=#E9E9E9
| 520216 ||  || — || December 31, 2008 || Kitt Peak || Spacewatch ||  || align=right | 1.6 km || 
|-id=217 bgcolor=#d6d6d6
| 520217 ||  || — || April 21, 2009 || Mount Lemmon || Mount Lemmon Survey ||  || align=right | 2.4 km || 
|-id=218 bgcolor=#d6d6d6
| 520218 ||  || — || February 26, 2014 || Haleakala || Pan-STARRS ||  || align=right | 2.4 km || 
|-id=219 bgcolor=#d6d6d6
| 520219 ||  || — || March 17, 2009 || Kitt Peak || Spacewatch ||  || align=right | 2.4 km || 
|-id=220 bgcolor=#E9E9E9
| 520220 ||  || — || April 14, 2010 || Kitt Peak || Spacewatch ||  || align=right | 1.1 km || 
|-id=221 bgcolor=#d6d6d6
| 520221 ||  || — || September 26, 2006 || Kitt Peak || Spacewatch ||  || align=right | 2.8 km || 
|-id=222 bgcolor=#d6d6d6
| 520222 ||  || — || November 11, 2006 || Mount Lemmon || Mount Lemmon Survey ||  || align=right | 2.4 km || 
|-id=223 bgcolor=#d6d6d6
| 520223 ||  || — || March 31, 2009 || Kitt Peak || Spacewatch ||  || align=right | 2.4 km || 
|-id=224 bgcolor=#fefefe
| 520224 ||  || — || February 28, 2014 || Mount Lemmon || Mount Lemmon Survey ||  || align=right data-sort-value="0.85" | 850 m || 
|-id=225 bgcolor=#E9E9E9
| 520225 ||  || — || April 7, 2010 || Kitt Peak || Spacewatch ||  || align=right | 1.2 km || 
|-id=226 bgcolor=#d6d6d6
| 520226 ||  || — || August 20, 2011 || Haleakala || Pan-STARRS ||  || align=right | 2.7 km || 
|-id=227 bgcolor=#d6d6d6
| 520227 ||  || — || September 22, 2011 || Kitt Peak || Spacewatch ||  || align=right | 2.5 km || 
|-id=228 bgcolor=#E9E9E9
| 520228 ||  || — || September 9, 2007 || Mount Lemmon || Mount Lemmon Survey ||  || align=right | 1.3 km || 
|-id=229 bgcolor=#E9E9E9
| 520229 ||  || — || October 28, 2008 || Kitt Peak || Spacewatch ||  || align=right data-sort-value="0.97" | 970 m || 
|-id=230 bgcolor=#d6d6d6
| 520230 ||  || — || October 2, 2006 || Mount Lemmon || Mount Lemmon Survey ||  || align=right | 2.5 km || 
|-id=231 bgcolor=#d6d6d6
| 520231 ||  || — || May 15, 2009 || Mount Lemmon || Mount Lemmon Survey ||  || align=right | 3.1 km || 
|-id=232 bgcolor=#E9E9E9
| 520232 ||  || — || February 28, 2014 || Haleakala || Pan-STARRS ||  || align=right | 1.2 km || 
|-id=233 bgcolor=#d6d6d6
| 520233 ||  || — || February 27, 2008 || Kitt Peak || Spacewatch || 7:4 || align=right | 3.1 km || 
|-id=234 bgcolor=#d6d6d6
| 520234 ||  || — || October 3, 2011 || Mount Lemmon || Mount Lemmon Survey ||  || align=right | 2.8 km || 
|-id=235 bgcolor=#E9E9E9
| 520235 ||  || — || September 18, 2011 || Mount Lemmon || Mount Lemmon Survey ||  || align=right | 2.1 km || 
|-id=236 bgcolor=#d6d6d6
| 520236 ||  || — || February 28, 2014 || Haleakala || Pan-STARRS ||  || align=right | 2.9 km || 
|-id=237 bgcolor=#d6d6d6
| 520237 ||  || — || August 22, 2004 || Kitt Peak || Spacewatch ||  || align=right | 2.1 km || 
|-id=238 bgcolor=#E9E9E9
| 520238 ||  || — || October 20, 2007 || Mount Lemmon || Mount Lemmon Survey ||  || align=right | 2.2 km || 
|-id=239 bgcolor=#d6d6d6
| 520239 ||  || — || November 9, 2007 || Kitt Peak || Spacewatch ||  || align=right | 2.2 km || 
|-id=240 bgcolor=#E9E9E9
| 520240 ||  || — || February 28, 2014 || Haleakala || Pan-STARRS ||  || align=right data-sort-value="0.98" | 980 m || 
|-id=241 bgcolor=#fefefe
| 520241 ||  || — || November 1, 2008 || Mount Lemmon || Mount Lemmon Survey ||  || align=right data-sort-value="0.94" | 940 m || 
|-id=242 bgcolor=#d6d6d6
| 520242 ||  || — || January 16, 2013 || Mount Lemmon || Mount Lemmon Survey ||  || align=right | 2.6 km || 
|-id=243 bgcolor=#E9E9E9
| 520243 ||  || — || October 15, 2007 || Mount Lemmon || Mount Lemmon Survey ||  || align=right | 2.0 km || 
|-id=244 bgcolor=#E9E9E9
| 520244 ||  || — || September 14, 2007 || Mount Lemmon || Mount Lemmon Survey ||  || align=right | 1.9 km || 
|-id=245 bgcolor=#E9E9E9
| 520245 ||  || — || February 2, 2009 || Catalina || CSS ||  || align=right | 2.1 km || 
|-id=246 bgcolor=#d6d6d6
| 520246 ||  || — || September 30, 2006 || Mount Lemmon || Mount Lemmon Survey ||  || align=right | 2.3 km || 
|-id=247 bgcolor=#E9E9E9
| 520247 ||  || — || September 15, 2007 || Mount Lemmon || Mount Lemmon Survey ||  || align=right | 1.1 km || 
|-id=248 bgcolor=#E9E9E9
| 520248 ||  || — || February 28, 2014 || Haleakala || Pan-STARRS ||  || align=right data-sort-value="0.98" | 980 m || 
|-id=249 bgcolor=#d6d6d6
| 520249 ||  || — || April 20, 2009 || Kitt Peak || Spacewatch ||  || align=right | 2.7 km || 
|-id=250 bgcolor=#E9E9E9
| 520250 ||  || — || April 24, 2006 || Kitt Peak || Spacewatch ||  || align=right data-sort-value="0.85" | 850 m || 
|-id=251 bgcolor=#E9E9E9
| 520251 ||  || — || December 22, 2012 || Haleakala || Pan-STARRS ||  || align=right | 1.1 km || 
|-id=252 bgcolor=#E9E9E9
| 520252 ||  || — || October 5, 2012 || Kitt Peak || Spacewatch ||  || align=right | 2.1 km || 
|-id=253 bgcolor=#fefefe
| 520253 ||  || — || February 9, 2014 || Haleakala || Pan-STARRS ||  || align=right data-sort-value="0.72" | 720 m || 
|-id=254 bgcolor=#fefefe
| 520254 ||  || — || February 9, 2010 || Mount Lemmon || Mount Lemmon Survey ||  || align=right data-sort-value="0.66" | 660 m || 
|-id=255 bgcolor=#fefefe
| 520255 ||  || — || March 16, 2007 || Mount Lemmon || Mount Lemmon Survey ||  || align=right data-sort-value="0.86" | 860 m || 
|-id=256 bgcolor=#fefefe
| 520256 ||  || — || March 8, 2014 || Mount Lemmon || Mount Lemmon Survey ||  || align=right data-sort-value="0.74" | 740 m || 
|-id=257 bgcolor=#fefefe
| 520257 ||  || — || January 6, 2010 || Kitt Peak || Spacewatch ||  || align=right data-sort-value="0.74" | 740 m || 
|-id=258 bgcolor=#fefefe
| 520258 ||  || — || August 27, 2011 || Haleakala || Pan-STARRS ||  || align=right data-sort-value="0.82" | 820 m || 
|-id=259 bgcolor=#E9E9E9
| 520259 ||  || — || August 24, 2007 || Kitt Peak || Spacewatch ||  || align=right | 1.4 km || 
|-id=260 bgcolor=#d6d6d6
| 520260 ||  || — || September 20, 2011 || Haleakala || Pan-STARRS ||  || align=right | 2.4 km || 
|-id=261 bgcolor=#d6d6d6
| 520261 ||  || — || February 28, 2014 || Haleakala || Pan-STARRS ||  || align=right | 2.8 km || 
|-id=262 bgcolor=#fefefe
| 520262 ||  || — || January 5, 2000 || Socorro || LINEAR ||  || align=right data-sort-value="0.82" | 820 m || 
|-id=263 bgcolor=#E9E9E9
| 520263 ||  || — || November 30, 2003 || Kitt Peak || Spacewatch ||  || align=right | 1.6 km || 
|-id=264 bgcolor=#d6d6d6
| 520264 ||  || — || November 7, 2012 || Kitt Peak || Spacewatch ||  || align=right | 2.4 km || 
|-id=265 bgcolor=#d6d6d6
| 520265 ||  || — || February 28, 2014 || Haleakala || Pan-STARRS ||  || align=right | 2.3 km || 
|-id=266 bgcolor=#d6d6d6
| 520266 ||  || — || February 28, 2014 || Haleakala || Pan-STARRS ||  || align=right | 2.0 km || 
|-id=267 bgcolor=#d6d6d6
| 520267 ||  || — || November 2, 2006 || Mount Lemmon || Mount Lemmon Survey ||  || align=right | 3.5 km || 
|-id=268 bgcolor=#d6d6d6
| 520268 ||  || — || September 19, 2011 || Haleakala || Pan-STARRS ||  || align=right | 2.6 km || 
|-id=269 bgcolor=#d6d6d6
| 520269 ||  || — || August 30, 2005 || Kitt Peak || Spacewatch ||  || align=right | 2.6 km || 
|-id=270 bgcolor=#d6d6d6
| 520270 ||  || — || September 25, 2006 || Mount Lemmon || Mount Lemmon Survey ||  || align=right | 2.5 km || 
|-id=271 bgcolor=#d6d6d6
| 520271 ||  || — || February 28, 2014 || Haleakala || Pan-STARRS ||  || align=right | 2.4 km || 
|-id=272 bgcolor=#d6d6d6
| 520272 ||  || — || September 2, 2011 || Haleakala || Pan-STARRS ||  || align=right | 2.2 km || 
|-id=273 bgcolor=#E9E9E9
| 520273 ||  || — || November 2, 2007 || Kitt Peak || Spacewatch ||  || align=right | 2.2 km || 
|-id=274 bgcolor=#E9E9E9
| 520274 ||  || — || August 10, 2011 || Haleakala || Pan-STARRS ||  || align=right | 1.5 km || 
|-id=275 bgcolor=#E9E9E9
| 520275 ||  || — || October 18, 2012 || Haleakala || Pan-STARRS ||  || align=right data-sort-value="0.65" | 650 m || 
|-id=276 bgcolor=#d6d6d6
| 520276 ||  || — || January 30, 2009 || Mount Lemmon || Mount Lemmon Survey ||  || align=right | 3.0 km || 
|-id=277 bgcolor=#d6d6d6
| 520277 ||  || — || July 28, 2011 || Haleakala || Pan-STARRS ||  || align=right | 1.9 km || 
|-id=278 bgcolor=#fefefe
| 520278 ||  || — || August 25, 2004 || Kitt Peak || Spacewatch ||  || align=right data-sort-value="0.68" | 680 m || 
|-id=279 bgcolor=#d6d6d6
| 520279 ||  || — || October 20, 2006 || Kitt Peak || Spacewatch ||  || align=right | 2.8 km || 
|-id=280 bgcolor=#E9E9E9
| 520280 ||  || — || December 1, 2008 || Kitt Peak || Spacewatch ||  || align=right | 1.1 km || 
|-id=281 bgcolor=#d6d6d6
| 520281 ||  || — || February 9, 2008 || Kitt Peak || Spacewatch ||  || align=right | 2.3 km || 
|-id=282 bgcolor=#d6d6d6
| 520282 ||  || — || February 9, 2008 || Mount Lemmon || Mount Lemmon Survey ||  || align=right | 2.8 km || 
|-id=283 bgcolor=#d6d6d6
| 520283 ||  || — || December 12, 2012 || Kitt Peak || Spacewatch ||  || align=right | 2.7 km || 
|-id=284 bgcolor=#E9E9E9
| 520284 ||  || — || June 4, 2011 || Mount Lemmon || Mount Lemmon Survey ||  || align=right | 2.0 km || 
|-id=285 bgcolor=#E9E9E9
| 520285 ||  || — || February 27, 2014 || Mount Lemmon || Mount Lemmon Survey ||  || align=right | 2.3 km || 
|-id=286 bgcolor=#d6d6d6
| 520286 ||  || — || March 6, 2008 || Mount Lemmon || Mount Lemmon Survey ||  || align=right | 2.8 km || 
|-id=287 bgcolor=#E9E9E9
| 520287 ||  || — || March 11, 2014 || Mount Lemmon || Mount Lemmon Survey ||  || align=right | 1.3 km || 
|-id=288 bgcolor=#d6d6d6
| 520288 ||  || — || October 21, 2006 || Kitt Peak || Spacewatch ||  || align=right | 3.1 km || 
|-id=289 bgcolor=#E9E9E9
| 520289 ||  || — || October 11, 2007 || Kitt Peak || Spacewatch ||  || align=right | 1.4 km || 
|-id=290 bgcolor=#fefefe
| 520290 ||  || — || February 28, 2014 || Mount Lemmon || Mount Lemmon Survey ||  || align=right data-sort-value="0.86" | 860 m || 
|-id=291 bgcolor=#d6d6d6
| 520291 ||  || — || December 31, 2007 || Kitt Peak || Spacewatch ||  || align=right | 3.6 km || 
|-id=292 bgcolor=#E9E9E9
| 520292 ||  || — || November 10, 2004 || Kitt Peak || Spacewatch ||  || align=right | 1.0 km || 
|-id=293 bgcolor=#fefefe
| 520293 ||  || — || February 26, 2014 || Haleakala || Pan-STARRS ||  || align=right data-sort-value="0.68" | 680 m || 
|-id=294 bgcolor=#d6d6d6
| 520294 ||  || — || March 7, 2014 || Mount Lemmon || Mount Lemmon Survey ||  || align=right | 2.9 km || 
|-id=295 bgcolor=#E9E9E9
| 520295 ||  || — || March 23, 2014 || Mount Lemmon || Mount Lemmon Survey ||  || align=right data-sort-value="0.94" | 940 m || 
|-id=296 bgcolor=#fefefe
| 520296 ||  || — || April 7, 2003 || Kitt Peak || Spacewatch ||  || align=right data-sort-value="0.58" | 580 m || 
|-id=297 bgcolor=#fefefe
| 520297 ||  || — || February 10, 2010 || Kitt Peak || Spacewatch ||  || align=right data-sort-value="0.87" | 870 m || 
|-id=298 bgcolor=#E9E9E9
| 520298 ||  || — || September 13, 2007 || Mount Lemmon || Mount Lemmon Survey ||  || align=right | 1.2 km || 
|-id=299 bgcolor=#E9E9E9
| 520299 ||  || — || March 28, 2014 || Mount Lemmon || Mount Lemmon Survey ||  || align=right data-sort-value="0.82" | 820 m || 
|-id=300 bgcolor=#d6d6d6
| 520300 ||  || — || September 21, 2011 || Mount Lemmon || Mount Lemmon Survey ||  || align=right | 2.8 km || 
|}

520301–520400 

|-bgcolor=#E9E9E9
| 520301 ||  || — || April 21, 2006 || Kitt Peak || Spacewatch ||  || align=right | 1.0 km || 
|-id=302 bgcolor=#d6d6d6
| 520302 ||  || — || March 24, 2014 || Haleakala || Pan-STARRS ||  || align=right | 2.7 km || 
|-id=303 bgcolor=#E9E9E9
| 520303 ||  || — || May 13, 2010 || Mount Lemmon || Mount Lemmon Survey ||  || align=right | 1.7 km || 
|-id=304 bgcolor=#E9E9E9
| 520304 ||  || — || October 23, 2011 || Mount Lemmon || Mount Lemmon Survey ||  || align=right | 1.3 km || 
|-id=305 bgcolor=#E9E9E9
| 520305 ||  || — || March 25, 2014 || Kitt Peak || Spacewatch ||  || align=right data-sort-value="0.79" | 790 m || 
|-id=306 bgcolor=#E9E9E9
| 520306 ||  || — || March 25, 2014 || Kitt Peak || Spacewatch ||  || align=right data-sort-value="0.82" | 820 m || 
|-id=307 bgcolor=#E9E9E9
| 520307 ||  || — || December 22, 2008 || Kitt Peak || Spacewatch ||  || align=right | 1.3 km || 
|-id=308 bgcolor=#d6d6d6
| 520308 ||  || — || October 29, 2005 || Kitt Peak || Spacewatch ||  || align=right | 3.2 km || 
|-id=309 bgcolor=#d6d6d6
| 520309 ||  || — || September 24, 2011 || Haleakala || Pan-STARRS ||  || align=right | 2.7 km || 
|-id=310 bgcolor=#d6d6d6
| 520310 ||  || — || May 15, 2009 || Kitt Peak || Spacewatch ||  || align=right | 3.3 km || 
|-id=311 bgcolor=#d6d6d6
| 520311 ||  || — || March 18, 2009 || Kitt Peak || Spacewatch ||  || align=right | 1.9 km || 
|-id=312 bgcolor=#d6d6d6
| 520312 ||  || — || February 2, 2009 || Kitt Peak || Spacewatch ||  || align=right | 2.7 km || 
|-id=313 bgcolor=#d6d6d6
| 520313 ||  || — || April 23, 2009 || Kitt Peak || Spacewatch ||  || align=right | 3.2 km || 
|-id=314 bgcolor=#E9E9E9
| 520314 ||  || — || March 31, 2014 || Mount Lemmon || Mount Lemmon Survey ||  || align=right | 1.2 km || 
|-id=315 bgcolor=#fefefe
| 520315 ||  || — || February 15, 2010 || Kitt Peak || Spacewatch || MAS || align=right data-sort-value="0.61" | 610 m || 
|-id=316 bgcolor=#fefefe
| 520316 ||  || — || September 24, 2008 || Mount Lemmon || Mount Lemmon Survey ||  || align=right data-sort-value="0.95" | 950 m || 
|-id=317 bgcolor=#fefefe
| 520317 ||  || — || February 14, 2010 || Kitt Peak || Spacewatch ||  || align=right data-sort-value="0.86" | 860 m || 
|-id=318 bgcolor=#E9E9E9
| 520318 ||  || — || February 1, 2013 || Haleakala || Pan-STARRS ||  || align=right | 1.4 km || 
|-id=319 bgcolor=#fefefe
| 520319 ||  || — || September 12, 2007 || Kitt Peak || Spacewatch ||  || align=right data-sort-value="0.91" | 910 m || 
|-id=320 bgcolor=#E9E9E9
| 520320 ||  || — || November 4, 2007 || Kitt Peak || Spacewatch ||  || align=right | 1.1 km || 
|-id=321 bgcolor=#E9E9E9
| 520321 ||  || — || September 28, 2003 || Kitt Peak || Spacewatch ||  || align=right data-sort-value="0.94" | 940 m || 
|-id=322 bgcolor=#E9E9E9
| 520322 ||  || — || April 1, 2014 || Mount Lemmon || Mount Lemmon Survey ||  || align=right | 1.4 km || 
|-id=323 bgcolor=#E9E9E9
| 520323 ||  || — || April 1, 2014 || Kitt Peak || Spacewatch ||  || align=right | 1.4 km || 
|-id=324 bgcolor=#d6d6d6
| 520324 ||  || — || March 15, 2008 || Kitt Peak || Spacewatch ||  || align=right | 2.3 km || 
|-id=325 bgcolor=#d6d6d6
| 520325 ||  || — || May 13, 2009 || Mount Lemmon || Mount Lemmon Survey ||  || align=right | 2.1 km || 
|-id=326 bgcolor=#d6d6d6
| 520326 ||  || — || September 17, 2006 || Kitt Peak || Spacewatch ||  || align=right | 2.5 km || 
|-id=327 bgcolor=#E9E9E9
| 520327 ||  || — || September 28, 2011 || Mount Lemmon || Mount Lemmon Survey ||  || align=right | 1.2 km || 
|-id=328 bgcolor=#E9E9E9
| 520328 ||  || — || April 4, 2014 || Haleakala || Pan-STARRS ||  || align=right | 2.3 km || 
|-id=329 bgcolor=#E9E9E9
| 520329 ||  || — || April 1, 2005 || Kitt Peak || Spacewatch ||  || align=right | 2.1 km || 
|-id=330 bgcolor=#E9E9E9
| 520330 ||  || — || September 21, 2011 || Kitt Peak || Spacewatch ||  || align=right | 1.4 km || 
|-id=331 bgcolor=#E9E9E9
| 520331 ||  || — || February 19, 2009 || Mount Lemmon || Mount Lemmon Survey ||  || align=right | 2.0 km || 
|-id=332 bgcolor=#d6d6d6
| 520332 ||  || — || April 4, 2014 || Haleakala || Pan-STARRS ||  || align=right | 2.7 km || 
|-id=333 bgcolor=#d6d6d6
| 520333 ||  || — || March 15, 2008 || Kitt Peak || Spacewatch ||  || align=right | 2.9 km || 
|-id=334 bgcolor=#d6d6d6
| 520334 ||  || — || October 26, 2011 || Haleakala || Pan-STARRS ||  || align=right | 2.6 km || 
|-id=335 bgcolor=#E9E9E9
| 520335 ||  || — || April 1, 2014 || Mount Lemmon || Mount Lemmon Survey ||  || align=right | 1.5 km || 
|-id=336 bgcolor=#d6d6d6
| 520336 ||  || — || April 5, 2014 || Haleakala || Pan-STARRS ||  || align=right | 2.8 km || 
|-id=337 bgcolor=#E9E9E9
| 520337 ||  || — || October 12, 2007 || Mount Lemmon || Mount Lemmon Survey ||  || align=right | 1.8 km || 
|-id=338 bgcolor=#d6d6d6
| 520338 ||  || — || September 23, 2005 || Kitt Peak || Spacewatch ||  || align=right | 2.3 km || 
|-id=339 bgcolor=#d6d6d6
| 520339 ||  || — || October 13, 2006 || Kitt Peak || Spacewatch ||  || align=right | 2.1 km || 
|-id=340 bgcolor=#E9E9E9
| 520340 ||  || — || February 14, 2005 || Kitt Peak || Spacewatch ||  || align=right | 1.4 km || 
|-id=341 bgcolor=#d6d6d6
| 520341 ||  || — || September 18, 2010 || Mount Lemmon || Mount Lemmon Survey ||  || align=right | 2.4 km || 
|-id=342 bgcolor=#E9E9E9
| 520342 ||  || — || December 22, 2012 || Haleakala || Pan-STARRS ||  || align=right | 1.2 km || 
|-id=343 bgcolor=#E9E9E9
| 520343 ||  || — || April 5, 2014 || Haleakala || Pan-STARRS ||  || align=right | 2.2 km || 
|-id=344 bgcolor=#d6d6d6
| 520344 ||  || — || September 4, 2010 || Mount Lemmon || Mount Lemmon Survey ||  || align=right | 3.2 km || 
|-id=345 bgcolor=#d6d6d6
| 520345 ||  || — || March 11, 2008 || Kitt Peak || Spacewatch ||  || align=right | 3.0 km || 
|-id=346 bgcolor=#d6d6d6
| 520346 ||  || — || October 11, 2005 || Kitt Peak || Spacewatch ||  || align=right | 2.5 km || 
|-id=347 bgcolor=#E9E9E9
| 520347 ||  || — || September 23, 2011 || Kitt Peak || Spacewatch ||  || align=right | 1.3 km || 
|-id=348 bgcolor=#E9E9E9
| 520348 ||  || — || November 9, 2007 || Kitt Peak || Spacewatch ||  || align=right | 2.3 km || 
|-id=349 bgcolor=#d6d6d6
| 520349 ||  || — || September 12, 2005 || Kitt Peak || Spacewatch ||  || align=right | 2.0 km || 
|-id=350 bgcolor=#E9E9E9
| 520350 ||  || — || April 5, 2014 || Haleakala || Pan-STARRS ||  || align=right data-sort-value="0.75" | 750 m || 
|-id=351 bgcolor=#d6d6d6
| 520351 ||  || — || April 5, 2014 || Haleakala || Pan-STARRS ||  || align=right | 2.1 km || 
|-id=352 bgcolor=#E9E9E9
| 520352 ||  || — || April 5, 2014 || Haleakala || Pan-STARRS ||  || align=right | 1.3 km || 
|-id=353 bgcolor=#d6d6d6
| 520353 ||  || — || April 4, 2008 || Kitt Peak || Spacewatch ||  || align=right | 3.5 km || 
|-id=354 bgcolor=#d6d6d6
| 520354 ||  || — || April 30, 2009 || Kitt Peak || Spacewatch ||  || align=right | 2.6 km || 
|-id=355 bgcolor=#d6d6d6
| 520355 ||  || — || October 26, 2011 || Haleakala || Pan-STARRS ||  || align=right | 2.1 km || 
|-id=356 bgcolor=#E9E9E9
| 520356 ||  || — || April 5, 2014 || Haleakala || Pan-STARRS ||  || align=right | 1.2 km || 
|-id=357 bgcolor=#d6d6d6
| 520357 ||  || — || October 24, 2011 || Haleakala || Pan-STARRS ||  || align=right | 2.3 km || 
|-id=358 bgcolor=#E9E9E9
| 520358 ||  || — || February 3, 2009 || Kitt Peak || Spacewatch ||  || align=right | 1.3 km || 
|-id=359 bgcolor=#d6d6d6
| 520359 ||  || — || April 9, 2014 || Haleakala || Pan-STARRS ||  || align=right | 2.8 km || 
|-id=360 bgcolor=#d6d6d6
| 520360 ||  || — || September 18, 2010 || Mount Lemmon || Mount Lemmon Survey ||  || align=right | 2.3 km || 
|-id=361 bgcolor=#d6d6d6
| 520361 ||  || — || March 25, 2014 || Kitt Peak || Spacewatch ||  || align=right | 2.4 km || 
|-id=362 bgcolor=#fefefe
| 520362 ||  || — || March 16, 2010 || Kitt Peak || Spacewatch ||  || align=right data-sort-value="0.82" | 820 m || 
|-id=363 bgcolor=#E9E9E9
| 520363 ||  || — || May 19, 2010 || Mount Lemmon || Mount Lemmon Survey || EUN || align=right data-sort-value="0.84" | 840 m || 
|-id=364 bgcolor=#E9E9E9
| 520364 ||  || — || November 7, 2012 || Mount Lemmon || Mount Lemmon Survey ||  || align=right data-sort-value="0.84" | 840 m || 
|-id=365 bgcolor=#fefefe
| 520365 ||  || — || January 26, 2006 || Kitt Peak || Spacewatch ||  || align=right data-sort-value="0.71" | 710 m || 
|-id=366 bgcolor=#d6d6d6
| 520366 ||  || — || February 3, 2013 || Haleakala || Pan-STARRS ||  || align=right | 2.1 km || 
|-id=367 bgcolor=#E9E9E9
| 520367 ||  || — || May 9, 2006 || Mount Lemmon || Mount Lemmon Survey ||  || align=right data-sort-value="0.98" | 980 m || 
|-id=368 bgcolor=#E9E9E9
| 520368 ||  || — || April 30, 2014 || Haleakala || Pan-STARRS ||  || align=right data-sort-value="0.71" | 710 m || 
|-id=369 bgcolor=#E9E9E9
| 520369 ||  || — || February 20, 2009 || Catalina || CSS ||  || align=right | 2.1 km || 
|-id=370 bgcolor=#E9E9E9
| 520370 ||  || — || December 22, 2012 || Haleakala || Pan-STARRS ||  || align=right | 1.1 km || 
|-id=371 bgcolor=#E9E9E9
| 520371 ||  || — || March 7, 2014 || Mount Lemmon || Mount Lemmon Survey ||  || align=right | 1.4 km || 
|-id=372 bgcolor=#E9E9E9
| 520372 ||  || — || October 26, 2011 || Haleakala || Pan-STARRS ||  || align=right data-sort-value="0.99" | 990 m || 
|-id=373 bgcolor=#fefefe
| 520373 ||  || — || October 6, 2004 || Kitt Peak || Spacewatch ||  || align=right data-sort-value="0.85" | 850 m || 
|-id=374 bgcolor=#E9E9E9
| 520374 ||  || — || November 8, 2007 || Kitt Peak || Spacewatch ||  || align=right | 1.6 km || 
|-id=375 bgcolor=#E9E9E9
| 520375 ||  || — || October 21, 2007 || Mount Lemmon || Mount Lemmon Survey ||  || align=right | 1.2 km || 
|-id=376 bgcolor=#E9E9E9
| 520376 ||  || — || October 28, 2011 || Mount Lemmon || Mount Lemmon Survey ||  || align=right | 1.4 km || 
|-id=377 bgcolor=#d6d6d6
| 520377 ||  || — || April 24, 2014 || Haleakala || Pan-STARRS ||  || align=right | 2.9 km || 
|-id=378 bgcolor=#E9E9E9
| 520378 ||  || — || May 21, 2006 || Kitt Peak || Spacewatch ||  || align=right data-sort-value="0.89" | 890 m || 
|-id=379 bgcolor=#E9E9E9
| 520379 ||  || — || December 21, 2008 || Kitt Peak || Spacewatch ||  || align=right data-sort-value="0.84" | 840 m || 
|-id=380 bgcolor=#E9E9E9
| 520380 ||  || — || September 23, 2011 || Haleakala || Pan-STARRS ||  || align=right | 1.5 km || 
|-id=381 bgcolor=#E9E9E9
| 520381 ||  || — || September 23, 2011 || Kitt Peak || Spacewatch ||  || align=right | 1.8 km || 
|-id=382 bgcolor=#E9E9E9
| 520382 ||  || — || August 27, 2006 || Kitt Peak || Spacewatch ||  || align=right | 1.9 km || 
|-id=383 bgcolor=#d6d6d6
| 520383 ||  || — || September 30, 2005 || Mount Lemmon || Mount Lemmon Survey ||  || align=right | 2.0 km || 
|-id=384 bgcolor=#d6d6d6
| 520384 ||  || — || September 18, 2010 || Mount Lemmon || Mount Lemmon Survey ||  || align=right | 2.8 km || 
|-id=385 bgcolor=#E9E9E9
| 520385 ||  || — || April 23, 2014 || Mount Lemmon || Mount Lemmon Survey ||  || align=right data-sort-value="0.92" | 920 m || 
|-id=386 bgcolor=#E9E9E9
| 520386 ||  || — || April 25, 2014 || Mount Lemmon || Mount Lemmon Survey ||  || align=right data-sort-value="0.82" | 820 m || 
|-id=387 bgcolor=#fefefe
| 520387 ||  || — || April 30, 2014 || Haleakala || Pan-STARRS ||  || align=right data-sort-value="0.65" | 650 m || 
|-id=388 bgcolor=#E9E9E9
| 520388 ||  || — || August 28, 2006 || Kitt Peak || Spacewatch ||  || align=right | 1.2 km || 
|-id=389 bgcolor=#E9E9E9
| 520389 ||  || — || September 29, 2011 || Kitt Peak || Spacewatch ||  || align=right | 2.2 km || 
|-id=390 bgcolor=#E9E9E9
| 520390 ||  || — || April 30, 2014 || Haleakala || Pan-STARRS ||  || align=right | 1.3 km || 
|-id=391 bgcolor=#E9E9E9
| 520391 ||  || — || January 17, 2013 || Haleakala || Pan-STARRS ||  || align=right | 1.3 km || 
|-id=392 bgcolor=#d6d6d6
| 520392 ||  || — || November 28, 2011 || Haleakala || Pan-STARRS || 7:4 || align=right | 3.3 km || 
|-id=393 bgcolor=#E9E9E9
| 520393 ||  || — || April 30, 2014 || Haleakala || Pan-STARRS ||  || align=right data-sort-value="0.94" | 940 m || 
|-id=394 bgcolor=#E9E9E9
| 520394 ||  || — || April 29, 2014 || Kitt Peak || Spacewatch ||  || align=right data-sort-value="0.78" | 780 m || 
|-id=395 bgcolor=#fefefe
| 520395 ||  || — || April 8, 2010 || Mount Lemmon || Mount Lemmon Survey || NYS || align=right data-sort-value="0.58" | 580 m || 
|-id=396 bgcolor=#fefefe
| 520396 ||  || — || October 20, 2011 || Haleakala || Pan-STARRS ||  || align=right data-sort-value="0.88" | 880 m || 
|-id=397 bgcolor=#E9E9E9
| 520397 ||  || — || March 14, 2010 || WISE || WISE ||  || align=right | 1.9 km || 
|-id=398 bgcolor=#E9E9E9
| 520398 ||  || — || May 5, 2014 || Mount Lemmon || Mount Lemmon Survey ||  || align=right | 1.3 km || 
|-id=399 bgcolor=#FA8072
| 520399 ||  || — || September 15, 2006 || Kitt Peak || Spacewatch ||  || align=right data-sort-value="0.68" | 680 m || 
|-id=400 bgcolor=#E9E9E9
| 520400 ||  || — || May 5, 2014 || Mount Lemmon || Mount Lemmon Survey ||  || align=right | 1.3 km || 
|}

520401–520500 

|-bgcolor=#E9E9E9
| 520401 ||  || — || October 15, 2007 || Kitt Peak || Spacewatch ||  || align=right | 1.1 km || 
|-id=402 bgcolor=#E9E9E9
| 520402 ||  || — || April 30, 2014 || Haleakala || Pan-STARRS ||  || align=right | 1.0 km || 
|-id=403 bgcolor=#E9E9E9
| 520403 ||  || — || October 18, 2011 || Mount Lemmon || Mount Lemmon Survey ||  || align=right data-sort-value="0.86" | 860 m || 
|-id=404 bgcolor=#E9E9E9
| 520404 ||  || — || January 19, 2005 || Kitt Peak || Spacewatch ||  || align=right data-sort-value="0.91" | 910 m || 
|-id=405 bgcolor=#E9E9E9
| 520405 ||  || — || November 2, 2007 || Mount Lemmon || Mount Lemmon Survey ||  || align=right data-sort-value="0.77" | 770 m || 
|-id=406 bgcolor=#E9E9E9
| 520406 ||  || — || January 18, 2005 || Kitt Peak || Spacewatch ||  || align=right | 1.1 km || 
|-id=407 bgcolor=#d6d6d6
| 520407 ||  || — || March 8, 2008 || Mount Lemmon || Mount Lemmon Survey ||  || align=right | 2.5 km || 
|-id=408 bgcolor=#d6d6d6
| 520408 ||  || — || November 11, 2006 || Kitt Peak || Spacewatch ||  || align=right | 3.2 km || 
|-id=409 bgcolor=#d6d6d6
| 520409 ||  || — || August 30, 2005 || Kitt Peak || Spacewatch ||  || align=right | 2.7 km || 
|-id=410 bgcolor=#E9E9E9
| 520410 ||  || — || September 23, 2011 || Haleakala || Pan-STARRS ||  || align=right | 2.2 km || 
|-id=411 bgcolor=#E9E9E9
| 520411 ||  || — || October 26, 2011 || Haleakala || Pan-STARRS ||  || align=right | 1.8 km || 
|-id=412 bgcolor=#E9E9E9
| 520412 ||  || — || August 27, 2006 || Kitt Peak || Spacewatch ||  || align=right | 1.9 km || 
|-id=413 bgcolor=#E9E9E9
| 520413 ||  || — || May 16, 2005 || Mount Lemmon || Mount Lemmon Survey ||  || align=right | 1.9 km || 
|-id=414 bgcolor=#d6d6d6
| 520414 ||  || — || February 8, 2008 || Kitt Peak || Spacewatch ||  || align=right | 2.4 km || 
|-id=415 bgcolor=#d6d6d6
| 520415 ||  || — || May 6, 2014 || Haleakala || Pan-STARRS ||  || align=right | 3.2 km || 
|-id=416 bgcolor=#E9E9E9
| 520416 ||  || — || October 28, 2011 || Mount Lemmon || Mount Lemmon Survey ||  || align=right | 2.0 km || 
|-id=417 bgcolor=#d6d6d6
| 520417 ||  || — || May 6, 2014 || Haleakala || Pan-STARRS ||  || align=right | 1.7 km || 
|-id=418 bgcolor=#d6d6d6
| 520418 ||  || — || October 28, 2011 || Mount Lemmon || Mount Lemmon Survey ||  || align=right | 2.7 km || 
|-id=419 bgcolor=#d6d6d6
| 520419 ||  || — || May 6, 2014 || Haleakala || Pan-STARRS ||  || align=right | 2.8 km || 
|-id=420 bgcolor=#d6d6d6
| 520420 ||  || — || January 12, 2002 || Kitt Peak || Spacewatch ||  || align=right | 2.6 km || 
|-id=421 bgcolor=#E9E9E9
| 520421 ||  || — || January 10, 2013 || Haleakala || Pan-STARRS ||  || align=right | 2.5 km || 
|-id=422 bgcolor=#E9E9E9
| 520422 ||  || — || June 4, 2005 || Kitt Peak || Spacewatch ||  || align=right | 1.9 km || 
|-id=423 bgcolor=#E9E9E9
| 520423 ||  || — || May 9, 2014 || Haleakala || Pan-STARRS ||  || align=right data-sort-value="0.99" | 990 m || 
|-id=424 bgcolor=#E9E9E9
| 520424 ||  || — || September 26, 2011 || Haleakala || Pan-STARRS ||  || align=right data-sort-value="0.78" | 780 m || 
|-id=425 bgcolor=#E9E9E9
| 520425 ||  || — || October 18, 2007 || Kitt Peak || Spacewatch ||  || align=right data-sort-value="0.97" | 970 m || 
|-id=426 bgcolor=#d6d6d6
| 520426 ||  || — || September 19, 2010 || Kitt Peak || Spacewatch ||  || align=right | 3.1 km || 
|-id=427 bgcolor=#E9E9E9
| 520427 ||  || — || December 5, 2007 || Kitt Peak || Spacewatch ||  || align=right | 1.7 km || 
|-id=428 bgcolor=#E9E9E9
| 520428 ||  || — || October 17, 2010 || Mount Lemmon || Mount Lemmon Survey ||  || align=right | 2.8 km || 
|-id=429 bgcolor=#E9E9E9
| 520429 ||  || — || December 9, 2012 || Mount Lemmon || Mount Lemmon Survey ||  || align=right | 1.5 km || 
|-id=430 bgcolor=#d6d6d6
| 520430 ||  || — || February 9, 2013 || Haleakala || Pan-STARRS ||  || align=right | 2.3 km || 
|-id=431 bgcolor=#d6d6d6
| 520431 ||  || — || February 13, 2008 || Mount Lemmon || Mount Lemmon Survey ||  || align=right | 2.0 km || 
|-id=432 bgcolor=#E9E9E9
| 520432 ||  || — || January 19, 2013 || Kitt Peak || Spacewatch ||  || align=right | 1.4 km || 
|-id=433 bgcolor=#d6d6d6
| 520433 ||  || — || March 8, 2013 || Haleakala || Pan-STARRS ||  || align=right | 2.8 km || 
|-id=434 bgcolor=#E9E9E9
| 520434 ||  || — || October 28, 2011 || Mount Lemmon || Mount Lemmon Survey ||  || align=right | 1.8 km || 
|-id=435 bgcolor=#fefefe
| 520435 ||  || — || October 16, 2011 || Haleakala || Pan-STARRS ||  || align=right data-sort-value="0.94" | 940 m || 
|-id=436 bgcolor=#fefefe
| 520436 ||  || — || October 24, 2008 || Kitt Peak || Spacewatch ||  || align=right data-sort-value="0.99" | 990 m || 
|-id=437 bgcolor=#E9E9E9
| 520437 ||  || — || November 8, 2007 || Kitt Peak || Spacewatch ||  || align=right | 1.3 km || 
|-id=438 bgcolor=#E9E9E9
| 520438 ||  || — || May 7, 2014 || Haleakala || Pan-STARRS ||  || align=right data-sort-value="0.82" | 820 m || 
|-id=439 bgcolor=#E9E9E9
| 520439 ||  || — || May 8, 2005 || Mount Lemmon || Mount Lemmon Survey ||  || align=right | 1.2 km || 
|-id=440 bgcolor=#E9E9E9
| 520440 ||  || — || May 21, 2014 || Haleakala || Pan-STARRS ||  || align=right data-sort-value="0.80" | 800 m || 
|-id=441 bgcolor=#E9E9E9
| 520441 ||  || — || April 30, 2014 || Haleakala || Pan-STARRS ||  || align=right data-sort-value="0.83" | 830 m || 
|-id=442 bgcolor=#E9E9E9
| 520442 ||  || — || September 29, 2011 || Mount Lemmon || Mount Lemmon Survey ||  || align=right data-sort-value="0.90" | 900 m || 
|-id=443 bgcolor=#d6d6d6
| 520443 ||  || — || February 10, 2008 || Mount Lemmon || Mount Lemmon Survey ||  || align=right | 2.1 km || 
|-id=444 bgcolor=#E9E9E9
| 520444 ||  || — || May 7, 2014 || Haleakala || Pan-STARRS ||  || align=right | 1.8 km || 
|-id=445 bgcolor=#E9E9E9
| 520445 ||  || — || May 8, 2014 || Haleakala || Pan-STARRS ||  || align=right | 1.0 km || 
|-id=446 bgcolor=#E9E9E9
| 520446 ||  || — || May 21, 2014 || Haleakala || Pan-STARRS ||  || align=right data-sort-value="0.87" | 870 m || 
|-id=447 bgcolor=#E9E9E9
| 520447 ||  || — || June 1, 2010 || Kitt Peak || Spacewatch ||  || align=right data-sort-value="0.98" | 980 m || 
|-id=448 bgcolor=#E9E9E9
| 520448 ||  || — || May 19, 2006 || Mount Lemmon || Mount Lemmon Survey ||  || align=right data-sort-value="0.89" | 890 m || 
|-id=449 bgcolor=#E9E9E9
| 520449 ||  || — || October 20, 2007 || Mount Lemmon || Mount Lemmon Survey ||  || align=right data-sort-value="0.90" | 900 m || 
|-id=450 bgcolor=#E9E9E9
| 520450 ||  || — || June 23, 2010 || Mount Lemmon || Mount Lemmon Survey ||  || align=right | 1.5 km || 
|-id=451 bgcolor=#E9E9E9
| 520451 ||  || — || February 5, 2013 || Mount Lemmon || Mount Lemmon Survey ||  || align=right | 1.7 km || 
|-id=452 bgcolor=#E9E9E9
| 520452 ||  || — || March 31, 2009 || Mount Lemmon || Mount Lemmon Survey ||  || align=right | 1.7 km || 
|-id=453 bgcolor=#fefefe
| 520453 ||  || — || May 20, 2014 || Haleakala || Pan-STARRS ||  || align=right data-sort-value="0.89" | 890 m || 
|-id=454 bgcolor=#d6d6d6
| 520454 ||  || — || November 12, 2005 || Kitt Peak || Spacewatch ||  || align=right | 2.5 km || 
|-id=455 bgcolor=#fefefe
| 520455 ||  || — || September 19, 2011 || Haleakala || Pan-STARRS ||  || align=right data-sort-value="0.86" | 860 m || 
|-id=456 bgcolor=#d6d6d6
| 520456 ||  || — || February 28, 2008 || Kitt Peak || Spacewatch ||  || align=right | 2.3 km || 
|-id=457 bgcolor=#E9E9E9
| 520457 ||  || — || May 21, 2014 || Haleakala || Pan-STARRS ||  || align=right | 1.3 km || 
|-id=458 bgcolor=#d6d6d6
| 520458 ||  || — || April 27, 2009 || Mount Lemmon || Mount Lemmon Survey ||  || align=right | 1.9 km || 
|-id=459 bgcolor=#d6d6d6
| 520459 ||  || — || September 3, 2010 || Mount Lemmon || Mount Lemmon Survey ||  || align=right | 2.9 km || 
|-id=460 bgcolor=#E9E9E9
| 520460 ||  || — || March 15, 2005 || Mount Lemmon || Mount Lemmon Survey ||  || align=right | 1.4 km || 
|-id=461 bgcolor=#d6d6d6
| 520461 ||  || — || January 10, 2008 || Mount Lemmon || Mount Lemmon Survey ||  || align=right | 2.0 km || 
|-id=462 bgcolor=#d6d6d6
| 520462 ||  || — || December 25, 2011 || Mount Lemmon || Mount Lemmon Survey ||  || align=right | 2.7 km || 
|-id=463 bgcolor=#E9E9E9
| 520463 ||  || — || September 30, 2011 || Mount Lemmon || Mount Lemmon Survey ||  || align=right | 1.5 km || 
|-id=464 bgcolor=#d6d6d6
| 520464 ||  || — || October 16, 2006 || Kitt Peak || Spacewatch ||  || align=right | 1.9 km || 
|-id=465 bgcolor=#E9E9E9
| 520465 ||  || — || May 21, 2014 || Haleakala || Pan-STARRS ||  || align=right | 1.3 km || 
|-id=466 bgcolor=#E9E9E9
| 520466 ||  || — || May 21, 2014 || Haleakala || Pan-STARRS ||  || align=right | 1.6 km || 
|-id=467 bgcolor=#d6d6d6
| 520467 ||  || — || November 18, 2006 || Kitt Peak || Spacewatch ||  || align=right | 2.7 km || 
|-id=468 bgcolor=#E9E9E9
| 520468 ||  || — || December 29, 2008 || Mount Lemmon || Mount Lemmon Survey ||  || align=right data-sort-value="0.88" | 880 m || 
|-id=469 bgcolor=#d6d6d6
| 520469 ||  || — || September 29, 2010 || Mount Lemmon || Mount Lemmon Survey ||  || align=right | 2.5 km || 
|-id=470 bgcolor=#E9E9E9
| 520470 ||  || — || January 6, 2013 || Kitt Peak || Spacewatch ||  || align=right | 2.2 km || 
|-id=471 bgcolor=#E9E9E9
| 520471 ||  || — || May 23, 2014 || Haleakala || Pan-STARRS ||  || align=right data-sort-value="0.74" | 740 m || 
|-id=472 bgcolor=#E9E9E9
| 520472 ||  || — || May 23, 2014 || Haleakala || Pan-STARRS ||  || align=right | 1.3 km || 
|-id=473 bgcolor=#d6d6d6
| 520473 ||  || — || March 11, 2008 || Kitt Peak || Spacewatch ||  || align=right | 2.5 km || 
|-id=474 bgcolor=#E9E9E9
| 520474 ||  || — || May 23, 2014 || Haleakala || Pan-STARRS ||  || align=right | 2.0 km || 
|-id=475 bgcolor=#E9E9E9
| 520475 ||  || — || June 8, 2005 || Kitt Peak || Spacewatch ||  || align=right | 2.1 km || 
|-id=476 bgcolor=#d6d6d6
| 520476 ||  || — || May 5, 2014 || Mount Lemmon || Mount Lemmon Survey ||  || align=right | 2.3 km || 
|-id=477 bgcolor=#d6d6d6
| 520477 ||  || — || February 15, 2013 || Haleakala || Pan-STARRS ||  || align=right | 2.5 km || 
|-id=478 bgcolor=#d6d6d6
| 520478 ||  || — || February 14, 2013 || Haleakala || Pan-STARRS ||  || align=right | 2.6 km || 
|-id=479 bgcolor=#d6d6d6
| 520479 ||  || — || February 15, 2013 || Haleakala || Pan-STARRS ||  || align=right | 2.1 km || 
|-id=480 bgcolor=#d6d6d6
| 520480 ||  || — || May 25, 2014 || Haleakala || Pan-STARRS ||  || align=right | 2.9 km || 
|-id=481 bgcolor=#E9E9E9
| 520481 ||  || — || February 2, 2013 || Mount Lemmon || Mount Lemmon Survey ||  || align=right | 2.5 km || 
|-id=482 bgcolor=#E9E9E9
| 520482 ||  || — || August 21, 2006 || Kitt Peak || Spacewatch ||  || align=right | 1.4 km || 
|-id=483 bgcolor=#E9E9E9
| 520483 ||  || — || May 25, 2014 || Haleakala || Pan-STARRS ||  || align=right | 1.8 km || 
|-id=484 bgcolor=#d6d6d6
| 520484 ||  || — || December 29, 2011 || Mount Lemmon || Mount Lemmon Survey ||  || align=right | 3.0 km || 
|-id=485 bgcolor=#d6d6d6
| 520485 ||  || — || April 6, 2008 || Kitt Peak || Spacewatch ||  || align=right | 2.5 km || 
|-id=486 bgcolor=#E9E9E9
| 520486 ||  || — || January 20, 2008 || Kitt Peak || Spacewatch ||  || align=right | 2.0 km || 
|-id=487 bgcolor=#d6d6d6
| 520487 ||  || — || March 18, 2013 || Mount Lemmon || Mount Lemmon Survey ||  || align=right | 2.8 km || 
|-id=488 bgcolor=#E9E9E9
| 520488 ||  || — || May 26, 2014 || Haleakala || Pan-STARRS ||  || align=right data-sort-value="0.94" | 940 m || 
|-id=489 bgcolor=#E9E9E9
| 520489 ||  || — || October 12, 2007 || Kitt Peak || Spacewatch ||  || align=right | 1.5 km || 
|-id=490 bgcolor=#E9E9E9
| 520490 ||  || — || February 3, 2013 || Haleakala || Pan-STARRS ||  || align=right | 1.8 km || 
|-id=491 bgcolor=#d6d6d6
| 520491 ||  || — || April 30, 2009 || Kitt Peak || Spacewatch ||  || align=right | 2.0 km || 
|-id=492 bgcolor=#d6d6d6
| 520492 ||  || — || April 12, 2013 || Haleakala || Pan-STARRS ||  || align=right | 2.8 km || 
|-id=493 bgcolor=#E9E9E9
| 520493 ||  || — || November 30, 2011 || Kitt Peak || Spacewatch ||  || align=right | 2.9 km || 
|-id=494 bgcolor=#d6d6d6
| 520494 ||  || — || May 7, 2014 || Haleakala || Pan-STARRS ||  || align=right | 3.5 km || 
|-id=495 bgcolor=#fefefe
| 520495 ||  || — || November 9, 2007 || Kitt Peak || Spacewatch ||  || align=right | 1.1 km || 
|-id=496 bgcolor=#E9E9E9
| 520496 ||  || — || May 23, 2014 || Kitt Peak || Spacewatch ||  || align=right | 1.3 km || 
|-id=497 bgcolor=#E9E9E9
| 520497 ||  || — || October 20, 2006 || Kitt Peak || Spacewatch ||  || align=right | 2.4 km || 
|-id=498 bgcolor=#E9E9E9
| 520498 ||  || — || January 20, 2009 || Kitt Peak || Spacewatch ||  || align=right data-sort-value="0.94" | 940 m || 
|-id=499 bgcolor=#E9E9E9
| 520499 ||  || — || May 6, 2014 || Haleakala || Pan-STARRS ||  || align=right | 1.4 km || 
|-id=500 bgcolor=#E9E9E9
| 520500 ||  || — || May 11, 2010 || Mount Lemmon || Mount Lemmon Survey ||  || align=right | 1.0 km || 
|}

520501–520600 

|-bgcolor=#E9E9E9
| 520501 ||  || — || September 15, 2007 || Mount Lemmon || Mount Lemmon Survey ||  || align=right | 1.8 km || 
|-id=502 bgcolor=#d6d6d6
| 520502 ||  || — || September 16, 2009 || Kitt Peak || Spacewatch ||  || align=right | 2.9 km || 
|-id=503 bgcolor=#d6d6d6
| 520503 ||  || — || February 21, 2013 || Haleakala || Pan-STARRS ||  || align=right | 2.8 km || 
|-id=504 bgcolor=#d6d6d6
| 520504 ||  || — || December 7, 2005 || Kitt Peak || Spacewatch ||  || align=right | 3.0 km || 
|-id=505 bgcolor=#d6d6d6
| 520505 ||  || — || August 21, 2004 || Kitt Peak || Spacewatch ||  || align=right | 2.4 km || 
|-id=506 bgcolor=#d6d6d6
| 520506 ||  || — || July 29, 2009 || Kitt Peak || Spacewatch ||  || align=right | 2.2 km || 
|-id=507 bgcolor=#d6d6d6
| 520507 ||  || — || August 29, 2009 || Kitt Peak || Spacewatch ||  || align=right | 2.7 km || 
|-id=508 bgcolor=#E9E9E9
| 520508 ||  || — || August 29, 2005 || Kitt Peak || Spacewatch ||  || align=right | 2.6 km || 
|-id=509 bgcolor=#E9E9E9
| 520509 ||  || — || December 10, 2006 || Kitt Peak || Spacewatch ||  || align=right | 2.7 km || 
|-id=510 bgcolor=#d6d6d6
| 520510 ||  || — || May 1, 2013 || Mount Lemmon || Mount Lemmon Survey ||  || align=right | 2.2 km || 
|-id=511 bgcolor=#E9E9E9
| 520511 ||  || — || March 31, 2009 || Kitt Peak || Spacewatch ||  || align=right | 1.1 km || 
|-id=512 bgcolor=#d6d6d6
| 520512 ||  || — || October 9, 2004 || Kitt Peak || Spacewatch ||  || align=right | 2.7 km || 
|-id=513 bgcolor=#d6d6d6
| 520513 ||  || — || November 28, 2010 || Mount Lemmon || Mount Lemmon Survey || 7:4 || align=right | 3.6 km || 
|-id=514 bgcolor=#d6d6d6
| 520514 ||  || — || June 3, 2014 || Haleakala || Pan-STARRS ||  || align=right | 2.7 km || 
|-id=515 bgcolor=#E9E9E9
| 520515 ||  || — || June 4, 2014 || Haleakala || Pan-STARRS ||  || align=right | 1.9 km || 
|-id=516 bgcolor=#d6d6d6
| 520516 ||  || — || November 3, 2010 || Mount Lemmon || Mount Lemmon Survey ||  || align=right | 3.2 km || 
|-id=517 bgcolor=#d6d6d6
| 520517 ||  || — || October 11, 2005 || Kitt Peak || Spacewatch ||  || align=right | 2.4 km || 
|-id=518 bgcolor=#fefefe
| 520518 ||  || — || May 7, 2014 || Haleakala || Pan-STARRS ||  || align=right data-sort-value="0.97" | 970 m || 
|-id=519 bgcolor=#d6d6d6
| 520519 ||  || — || October 11, 2010 || Mount Lemmon || Mount Lemmon Survey ||  || align=right | 2.7 km || 
|-id=520 bgcolor=#E9E9E9
| 520520 ||  || — || June 8, 2014 || Haleakala || Pan-STARRS ||  || align=right | 1.4 km || 
|-id=521 bgcolor=#E9E9E9
| 520521 ||  || — || April 25, 2010 || Mount Lemmon || Mount Lemmon Survey ||  || align=right | 1.2 km || 
|-id=522 bgcolor=#d6d6d6
| 520522 ||  || — || September 5, 2000 || Anderson Mesa || LONEOS ||  || align=right | 2.3 km || 
|-id=523 bgcolor=#E9E9E9
| 520523 ||  || — || April 10, 2014 || Haleakala || Pan-STARRS ||  || align=right | 1.8 km || 
|-id=524 bgcolor=#E9E9E9
| 520524 ||  || — || June 25, 2014 || Mount Lemmon || Mount Lemmon Survey ||  || align=right | 2.3 km || 
|-id=525 bgcolor=#E9E9E9
| 520525 ||  || — || April 4, 2014 || Haleakala || Pan-STARRS ||  || align=right | 1.3 km || 
|-id=526 bgcolor=#E9E9E9
| 520526 ||  || — || September 30, 2011 || Kitt Peak || Spacewatch ||  || align=right | 1.3 km || 
|-id=527 bgcolor=#E9E9E9
| 520527 ||  || — || May 25, 2014 || Haleakala || Pan-STARRS ||  || align=right | 1.7 km || 
|-id=528 bgcolor=#E9E9E9
| 520528 ||  || — || May 17, 2009 || Mount Lemmon || Mount Lemmon Survey ||  || align=right | 1.6 km || 
|-id=529 bgcolor=#d6d6d6
| 520529 ||  || — || June 9, 2008 || Kitt Peak || Spacewatch ||  || align=right | 3.2 km || 
|-id=530 bgcolor=#E9E9E9
| 520530 ||  || — || May 25, 2009 || Kitt Peak || Spacewatch ||  || align=right | 1.8 km || 
|-id=531 bgcolor=#d6d6d6
| 520531 ||  || — || December 24, 2005 || Kitt Peak || Spacewatch ||  || align=right | 3.2 km || 
|-id=532 bgcolor=#d6d6d6
| 520532 ||  || — || March 6, 2013 || Haleakala || Pan-STARRS ||  || align=right | 2.5 km || 
|-id=533 bgcolor=#d6d6d6
| 520533 ||  || — || April 9, 2013 || Haleakala || Pan-STARRS ||  || align=right | 2.4 km || 
|-id=534 bgcolor=#d6d6d6
| 520534 ||  || — || November 13, 2010 || Mount Lemmon || Mount Lemmon Survey ||  || align=right | 2.1 km || 
|-id=535 bgcolor=#d6d6d6
| 520535 ||  || — || January 18, 2012 || Kitt Peak || Spacewatch ||  || align=right | 3.4 km || 
|-id=536 bgcolor=#d6d6d6
| 520536 ||  || — || November 12, 2005 || Kitt Peak || Spacewatch ||  || align=right | 3.0 km || 
|-id=537 bgcolor=#E9E9E9
| 520537 ||  || — || September 10, 2010 || Mount Lemmon || Mount Lemmon Survey ||  || align=right | 2.1 km || 
|-id=538 bgcolor=#d6d6d6
| 520538 ||  || — || September 21, 2003 || Kitt Peak || Spacewatch ||  || align=right | 3.7 km || 
|-id=539 bgcolor=#d6d6d6
| 520539 ||  || — || June 21, 2014 || Mount Lemmon || Mount Lemmon Survey ||  || align=right | 2.5 km || 
|-id=540 bgcolor=#d6d6d6
| 520540 ||  || — || January 25, 2012 || Haleakala || Pan-STARRS ||  || align=right | 2.8 km || 
|-id=541 bgcolor=#d6d6d6
| 520541 ||  || — || January 26, 2012 || Mount Lemmon || Mount Lemmon Survey ||  || align=right | 2.9 km || 
|-id=542 bgcolor=#d6d6d6
| 520542 ||  || — || June 27, 2014 || Haleakala || Pan-STARRS ||  || align=right | 3.1 km || 
|-id=543 bgcolor=#E9E9E9
| 520543 ||  || — || October 27, 2006 || Kitt Peak || Spacewatch ||  || align=right | 1.3 km || 
|-id=544 bgcolor=#d6d6d6
| 520544 ||  || — || September 3, 2010 || Mount Lemmon || Mount Lemmon Survey ||  || align=right | 3.0 km || 
|-id=545 bgcolor=#d6d6d6
| 520545 ||  || — || April 11, 2013 || Mount Lemmon || Mount Lemmon Survey ||  || align=right | 2.5 km || 
|-id=546 bgcolor=#E9E9E9
| 520546 ||  || — || February 8, 2008 || Kitt Peak || Spacewatch ||  || align=right | 1.3 km || 
|-id=547 bgcolor=#d6d6d6
| 520547 ||  || — || February 3, 2012 || Haleakala || Pan-STARRS ||  || align=right | 2.5 km || 
|-id=548 bgcolor=#E9E9E9
| 520548 ||  || — || August 30, 2005 || Kitt Peak || Spacewatch ||  || align=right | 1.8 km || 
|-id=549 bgcolor=#d6d6d6
| 520549 ||  || — || April 19, 2013 || Haleakala || Pan-STARRS ||  || align=right | 2.7 km || 
|-id=550 bgcolor=#E9E9E9
| 520550 ||  || — || November 12, 2010 || Mount Lemmon || Mount Lemmon Survey ||  || align=right | 2.0 km || 
|-id=551 bgcolor=#E9E9E9
| 520551 ||  || — || January 31, 2009 || Kitt Peak || Spacewatch ||  || align=right data-sort-value="0.71" | 710 m || 
|-id=552 bgcolor=#E9E9E9
| 520552 ||  || — || June 29, 2014 || Haleakala || Pan-STARRS ||  || align=right | 1.1 km || 
|-id=553 bgcolor=#E9E9E9
| 520553 ||  || — || February 6, 2013 || Kitt Peak || Spacewatch ||  || align=right data-sort-value="0.86" | 860 m || 
|-id=554 bgcolor=#d6d6d6
| 520554 ||  || — || January 29, 2007 || Kitt Peak || Spacewatch ||  || align=right | 2.7 km || 
|-id=555 bgcolor=#E9E9E9
| 520555 ||  || — || September 2, 2010 || Mount Lemmon || Mount Lemmon Survey ||  || align=right | 1.7 km || 
|-id=556 bgcolor=#d6d6d6
| 520556 ||  || — || August 18, 2009 || Kitt Peak || Spacewatch ||  || align=right | 2.5 km || 
|-id=557 bgcolor=#d6d6d6
| 520557 ||  || — || December 2, 2010 || Mount Lemmon || Mount Lemmon Survey || 7:4 || align=right | 3.7 km || 
|-id=558 bgcolor=#d6d6d6
| 520558 ||  || — || March 15, 2007 || Kitt Peak || Spacewatch ||  || align=right | 2.9 km || 
|-id=559 bgcolor=#fefefe
| 520559 ||  || — || October 18, 2011 || Mount Lemmon || Mount Lemmon Survey ||  || align=right data-sort-value="0.74" | 740 m || 
|-id=560 bgcolor=#E9E9E9
| 520560 ||  || — || June 30, 2014 || Haleakala || Pan-STARRS ||  || align=right | 2.4 km || 
|-id=561 bgcolor=#E9E9E9
| 520561 ||  || — || October 2, 2006 || Kitt Peak || Spacewatch ||  || align=right data-sort-value="0.90" | 900 m || 
|-id=562 bgcolor=#E9E9E9
| 520562 ||  || — || November 3, 2007 || Kitt Peak || Spacewatch ||  || align=right | 1.6 km || 
|-id=563 bgcolor=#E9E9E9
| 520563 ||  || — || February 2, 2005 || Kitt Peak || Spacewatch ||  || align=right data-sort-value="0.90" | 900 m || 
|-id=564 bgcolor=#d6d6d6
| 520564 ||  || — || July 2, 2014 || Haleakala || Pan-STARRS ||  || align=right | 2.5 km || 
|-id=565 bgcolor=#d6d6d6
| 520565 ||  || — || July 2, 2014 || Haleakala || Pan-STARRS ||  || align=right | 2.8 km || 
|-id=566 bgcolor=#E9E9E9
| 520566 ||  || — || June 28, 2014 || Haleakala || Pan-STARRS ||  || align=right | 2.1 km || 
|-id=567 bgcolor=#d6d6d6
| 520567 ||  || — || May 5, 2008 || Catalina || CSS ||  || align=right | 3.9 km || 
|-id=568 bgcolor=#d6d6d6
| 520568 ||  || — || July 1, 2014 || Haleakala || Pan-STARRS ||  || align=right | 2.9 km || 
|-id=569 bgcolor=#d6d6d6
| 520569 ||  || — || April 18, 2013 || Kitt Peak || Spacewatch ||  || align=right | 2.8 km || 
|-id=570 bgcolor=#d6d6d6
| 520570 ||  || — || February 23, 2007 || Catalina || CSS ||  || align=right | 3.4 km || 
|-id=571 bgcolor=#d6d6d6
| 520571 ||  || — || January 4, 2012 || Mount Lemmon || Mount Lemmon Survey ||  || align=right | 2.8 km || 
|-id=572 bgcolor=#E9E9E9
| 520572 ||  || — || December 20, 2007 || Kitt Peak || Spacewatch ||  || align=right | 1.8 km || 
|-id=573 bgcolor=#d6d6d6
| 520573 ||  || — || March 12, 2007 || Mount Lemmon || Mount Lemmon Survey ||  || align=right | 2.3 km || 
|-id=574 bgcolor=#d6d6d6
| 520574 ||  || — || August 17, 2009 || Kitt Peak || Spacewatch ||  || align=right | 2.5 km || 
|-id=575 bgcolor=#d6d6d6
| 520575 ||  || — || October 15, 2004 || Kitt Peak || Spacewatch ||  || align=right | 2.3 km || 
|-id=576 bgcolor=#E9E9E9
| 520576 ||  || — || September 17, 2010 || Mount Lemmon || Mount Lemmon Survey ||  || align=right | 1.8 km || 
|-id=577 bgcolor=#E9E9E9
| 520577 ||  || — || December 13, 2006 || Kitt Peak || Spacewatch ||  || align=right | 1.8 km || 
|-id=578 bgcolor=#d6d6d6
| 520578 ||  || — || December 8, 2005 || Kitt Peak || Spacewatch ||  || align=right | 2.6 km || 
|-id=579 bgcolor=#d6d6d6
| 520579 ||  || — || July 8, 2014 || Haleakala || Pan-STARRS ||  || align=right | 2.1 km || 
|-id=580 bgcolor=#d6d6d6
| 520580 ||  || — || February 23, 2007 || Kitt Peak || Spacewatch ||  || align=right | 3.1 km || 
|-id=581 bgcolor=#E9E9E9
| 520581 ||  || — || March 16, 2013 || Kitt Peak || Spacewatch ||  || align=right | 1.8 km || 
|-id=582 bgcolor=#d6d6d6
| 520582 ||  || — || January 30, 2012 || Mount Lemmon || Mount Lemmon Survey ||  || align=right | 2.7 km || 
|-id=583 bgcolor=#d6d6d6
| 520583 ||  || — || July 8, 2014 || Haleakala || Pan-STARRS ||  || align=right | 2.4 km || 
|-id=584 bgcolor=#d6d6d6
| 520584 ||  || — || April 11, 2013 || Mount Lemmon || Mount Lemmon Survey ||  || align=right | 2.5 km || 
|-id=585 bgcolor=#FFC2E0
| 520585 ||  || — || July 23, 2014 || SONEAR || SONEAR Obs. || AMO || align=right data-sort-value="0.18" | 180 m || 
|-id=586 bgcolor=#E9E9E9
| 520586 ||  || — || February 14, 2013 || Haleakala || Pan-STARRS ||  || align=right | 1.7 km || 
|-id=587 bgcolor=#E9E9E9
| 520587 ||  || — || June 4, 2014 || Haleakala || Pan-STARRS ||  || align=right | 2.1 km || 
|-id=588 bgcolor=#E9E9E9
| 520588 ||  || — || October 25, 2011 || Haleakala || Pan-STARRS ||  || align=right | 2.2 km || 
|-id=589 bgcolor=#E9E9E9
| 520589 ||  || — || March 8, 2013 || Haleakala || Pan-STARRS ||  || align=right | 1.9 km || 
|-id=590 bgcolor=#E9E9E9
| 520590 ||  || — || May 17, 2009 || Mount Lemmon || Mount Lemmon Survey ||  || align=right | 2.1 km || 
|-id=591 bgcolor=#d6d6d6
| 520591 ||  || — || October 22, 2009 || Mount Lemmon || Mount Lemmon Survey ||  || align=right | 2.4 km || 
|-id=592 bgcolor=#d6d6d6
| 520592 ||  || — || July 27, 2014 || Haleakala || Pan-STARRS || NAE || align=right | 2.0 km || 
|-id=593 bgcolor=#E9E9E9
| 520593 ||  || — || June 2, 2014 || Haleakala || Pan-STARRS ||  || align=right data-sort-value="0.87" | 870 m || 
|-id=594 bgcolor=#E9E9E9
| 520594 ||  || — || February 9, 2008 || Kitt Peak || Spacewatch ||  || align=right | 2.0 km || 
|-id=595 bgcolor=#E9E9E9
| 520595 ||  || — || October 18, 2001 || Kitt Peak || Spacewatch ||  || align=right | 2.0 km || 
|-id=596 bgcolor=#d6d6d6
| 520596 ||  || — || February 25, 2007 || Kitt Peak || Spacewatch ||  || align=right | 2.1 km || 
|-id=597 bgcolor=#d6d6d6
| 520597 ||  || — || September 9, 2008 || Kitt Peak || Spacewatch || 7:4 || align=right | 3.9 km || 
|-id=598 bgcolor=#E9E9E9
| 520598 ||  || — || October 9, 2010 || Mount Lemmon || Mount Lemmon Survey ||  || align=right | 1.5 km || 
|-id=599 bgcolor=#E9E9E9
| 520599 ||  || — || October 22, 1998 || Caussols || ODAS ||  || align=right data-sort-value="0.94" | 940 m || 
|-id=600 bgcolor=#E9E9E9
| 520600 ||  || — || September 2, 2010 || Mount Lemmon || Mount Lemmon Survey ||  || align=right | 1.2 km || 
|}

520601–520700 

|-bgcolor=#d6d6d6
| 520601 ||  || — || February 3, 2012 || Haleakala || Pan-STARRS ||  || align=right | 2.2 km || 
|-id=602 bgcolor=#d6d6d6
| 520602 ||  || — || November 10, 2010 || Mount Lemmon || Mount Lemmon Survey ||  || align=right | 1.8 km || 
|-id=603 bgcolor=#E9E9E9
| 520603 ||  || — || January 2, 2012 || Mount Lemmon || Mount Lemmon Survey || critical || align=right | 2.0 km || 
|-id=604 bgcolor=#d6d6d6
| 520604 ||  || — || July 25, 2014 || Haleakala || Pan-STARRS ||  || align=right | 2.3 km || 
|-id=605 bgcolor=#E9E9E9
| 520605 ||  || — || July 25, 2014 || Haleakala || Pan-STARRS ||  || align=right | 1.8 km || 
|-id=606 bgcolor=#d6d6d6
| 520606 ||  || — || January 30, 2012 || Kitt Peak || Spacewatch ||  || align=right | 2.6 km || 
|-id=607 bgcolor=#d6d6d6
| 520607 ||  || — || January 27, 2012 || Mount Lemmon || Mount Lemmon Survey ||  || align=right | 2.5 km || 
|-id=608 bgcolor=#d6d6d6
| 520608 ||  || — || December 2, 2005 || Kitt Peak || Spacewatch ||  || align=right | 2.5 km || 
|-id=609 bgcolor=#E9E9E9
| 520609 ||  || — || September 1, 2005 || Kitt Peak || Spacewatch ||  || align=right | 1.9 km || 
|-id=610 bgcolor=#E9E9E9
| 520610 ||  || — || August 30, 2005 || Kitt Peak || Spacewatch ||  || align=right | 1.8 km || 
|-id=611 bgcolor=#E9E9E9
| 520611 ||  || — || September 30, 2010 || Mount Lemmon || Mount Lemmon Survey ||  || align=right | 1.1 km || 
|-id=612 bgcolor=#E9E9E9
| 520612 ||  || — || November 12, 2010 || Mount Lemmon || Mount Lemmon Survey ||  || align=right | 1.8 km || 
|-id=613 bgcolor=#d6d6d6
| 520613 ||  || — || January 18, 2012 || Mount Lemmon || Mount Lemmon Survey ||  || align=right | 1.9 km || 
|-id=614 bgcolor=#E9E9E9
| 520614 ||  || — || February 8, 2008 || Kitt Peak || Spacewatch ||  || align=right | 1.5 km || 
|-id=615 bgcolor=#E9E9E9
| 520615 ||  || — || October 29, 2010 || Mount Lemmon || Mount Lemmon Survey ||  || align=right data-sort-value="0.98" | 980 m || 
|-id=616 bgcolor=#d6d6d6
| 520616 ||  || — || February 28, 2012 || Haleakala || Pan-STARRS ||  || align=right | 2.5 km || 
|-id=617 bgcolor=#fefefe
| 520617 ||  || — || February 17, 2013 || Kitt Peak || Spacewatch ||  || align=right data-sort-value="0.98" | 980 m || 
|-id=618 bgcolor=#d6d6d6
| 520618 ||  || — || July 29, 2014 || Haleakala || Pan-STARRS ||  || align=right | 2.4 km || 
|-id=619 bgcolor=#d6d6d6
| 520619 ||  || — || October 7, 2004 || Kitt Peak || Spacewatch ||  || align=right | 2.9 km || 
|-id=620 bgcolor=#E9E9E9
| 520620 ||  || — || September 12, 2010 || Kitt Peak || Spacewatch ||  || align=right | 2.1 km || 
|-id=621 bgcolor=#d6d6d6
| 520621 ||  || — || August 18, 2009 || Kitt Peak || Spacewatch ||  || align=right | 2.3 km || 
|-id=622 bgcolor=#d6d6d6
| 520622 ||  || — || July 30, 2014 || Haleakala || Pan-STARRS ||  || align=right | 2.4 km || 
|-id=623 bgcolor=#d6d6d6
| 520623 ||  || — || August 28, 2009 || Kitt Peak || Spacewatch ||  || align=right | 2.3 km || 
|-id=624 bgcolor=#E9E9E9
| 520624 ||  || — || October 11, 2010 || Mount Lemmon || Mount Lemmon Survey ||  || align=right | 1.4 km || 
|-id=625 bgcolor=#E9E9E9
| 520625 ||  || — || April 22, 2009 || Mount Lemmon || Mount Lemmon Survey ||  || align=right | 1.1 km || 
|-id=626 bgcolor=#fefefe
| 520626 ||  || — || July 31, 2014 || Haleakala || Pan-STARRS ||  || align=right data-sort-value="0.74" | 740 m || 
|-id=627 bgcolor=#d6d6d6
| 520627 ||  || — || December 5, 2010 || Mount Lemmon || Mount Lemmon Survey ||  || align=right | 3.2 km || 
|-id=628 bgcolor=#fefefe
| 520628 ||  || — || April 7, 2013 || Kitt Peak || Spacewatch ||  || align=right data-sort-value="0.85" | 850 m || 
|-id=629 bgcolor=#E9E9E9
| 520629 ||  || — || April 22, 2013 || Mount Lemmon || Mount Lemmon Survey ||  || align=right | 1.9 km || 
|-id=630 bgcolor=#d6d6d6
| 520630 ||  || — || December 4, 2005 || Kitt Peak || Spacewatch ||  || align=right | 2.2 km || 
|-id=631 bgcolor=#d6d6d6
| 520631 ||  || — || December 6, 2005 || Kitt Peak || Spacewatch ||  || align=right | 2.6 km || 
|-id=632 bgcolor=#E9E9E9
| 520632 ||  || — || May 7, 2014 || Haleakala || Pan-STARRS ||  || align=right | 1.8 km || 
|-id=633 bgcolor=#d6d6d6
| 520633 ||  || — || January 19, 2012 || Haleakala || Pan-STARRS ||  || align=right | 2.0 km || 
|-id=634 bgcolor=#d6d6d6
| 520634 ||  || — || May 12, 2013 || Mount Lemmon || Mount Lemmon Survey ||  || align=right | 1.9 km || 
|-id=635 bgcolor=#d6d6d6
| 520635 ||  || — || February 3, 2012 || Haleakala || Pan-STARRS ||  || align=right | 2.3 km || 
|-id=636 bgcolor=#d6d6d6
| 520636 ||  || — || February 15, 2012 || Haleakala || Pan-STARRS ||  || align=right | 1.8 km || 
|-id=637 bgcolor=#E9E9E9
| 520637 ||  || — || March 26, 2009 || Kitt Peak || Spacewatch ||  || align=right | 1.3 km || 
|-id=638 bgcolor=#d6d6d6
| 520638 ||  || — || August 3, 2014 || Haleakala || Pan-STARRS ||  || align=right | 2.3 km || 
|-id=639 bgcolor=#fefefe
| 520639 ||  || — || March 3, 2005 || Kitt Peak || Spacewatch ||  || align=right data-sort-value="0.90" | 900 m || 
|-id=640 bgcolor=#E9E9E9
| 520640 ||  || — || September 26, 2006 || Kitt Peak || Spacewatch ||  || align=right data-sort-value="0.75" | 750 m || 
|-id=641 bgcolor=#d6d6d6
| 520641 ||  || — || August 3, 2014 || Haleakala || Pan-STARRS ||  || align=right | 2.8 km || 
|-id=642 bgcolor=#d6d6d6
| 520642 ||  || — || January 30, 2011 || Mount Lemmon || Mount Lemmon Survey ||  || align=right | 2.6 km || 
|-id=643 bgcolor=#d6d6d6
| 520643 ||  || — || January 3, 2012 || Kitt Peak || Spacewatch ||  || align=right | 2.3 km || 
|-id=644 bgcolor=#d6d6d6
| 520644 ||  || — || August 17, 2009 || Kitt Peak || Spacewatch ||  || align=right | 2.7 km || 
|-id=645 bgcolor=#d6d6d6
| 520645 ||  || — || August 28, 2009 || Kitt Peak || Spacewatch ||  || align=right | 2.2 km || 
|-id=646 bgcolor=#E9E9E9
| 520646 ||  || — || August 29, 2005 || Kitt Peak || Spacewatch ||  || align=right | 2.2 km || 
|-id=647 bgcolor=#d6d6d6
| 520647 ||  || — || March 13, 2012 || Kitt Peak || Spacewatch ||  || align=right | 2.8 km || 
|-id=648 bgcolor=#d6d6d6
| 520648 ||  || — || February 10, 2008 || Mount Lemmon || Mount Lemmon Survey ||  || align=right | 1.9 km || 
|-id=649 bgcolor=#E9E9E9
| 520649 ||  || — || November 11, 2006 || Kitt Peak || Spacewatch ||  || align=right | 1.3 km || 
|-id=650 bgcolor=#E9E9E9
| 520650 ||  || — || December 21, 2006 || Kitt Peak || Spacewatch ||  || align=right | 2.3 km || 
|-id=651 bgcolor=#E9E9E9
| 520651 ||  || — || July 7, 2005 || Kitt Peak || Spacewatch ||  || align=right | 1.4 km || 
|-id=652 bgcolor=#d6d6d6
| 520652 ||  || — || April 15, 2012 || Haleakala || Pan-STARRS ||  || align=right | 2.9 km || 
|-id=653 bgcolor=#E9E9E9
| 520653 ||  || — || December 27, 2006 || Mount Lemmon || Mount Lemmon Survey ||  || align=right | 1.8 km || 
|-id=654 bgcolor=#E9E9E9
| 520654 ||  || — || April 28, 2009 || Kitt Peak || Spacewatch ||  || align=right | 1.7 km || 
|-id=655 bgcolor=#d6d6d6
| 520655 ||  || — || March 11, 2007 || Mount Lemmon || Mount Lemmon Survey ||  || align=right | 2.5 km || 
|-id=656 bgcolor=#d6d6d6
| 520656 ||  || — || January 19, 2012 || Haleakala || Pan-STARRS ||  || align=right | 2.5 km || 
|-id=657 bgcolor=#d6d6d6
| 520657 ||  || — || January 14, 2011 || Kitt Peak || Spacewatch ||  || align=right | 3.4 km || 
|-id=658 bgcolor=#d6d6d6
| 520658 ||  || — || February 10, 2011 || Mount Lemmon || Mount Lemmon Survey ||  || align=right | 3.2 km || 
|-id=659 bgcolor=#E9E9E9
| 520659 ||  || — || March 7, 2013 || Kitt Peak || Spacewatch ||  || align=right | 2.0 km || 
|-id=660 bgcolor=#d6d6d6
| 520660 ||  || — || September 21, 2009 || Mount Lemmon || Mount Lemmon Survey ||  || align=right | 2.3 km || 
|-id=661 bgcolor=#E9E9E9
| 520661 ||  || — || March 15, 2013 || Kitt Peak || Spacewatch ||  || align=right | 2.5 km || 
|-id=662 bgcolor=#E9E9E9
| 520662 ||  || — || August 29, 2014 || Haleakala || Pan-STARRS ||  || align=right | 1.9 km || 
|-id=663 bgcolor=#d6d6d6
| 520663 ||  || — || August 30, 2008 || Socorro || LINEAR ||  || align=right | 3.2 km || 
|-id=664 bgcolor=#E9E9E9
| 520664 ||  || — || September 23, 2005 || Kitt Peak || Spacewatch ||  || align=right | 1.8 km || 
|-id=665 bgcolor=#d6d6d6
| 520665 ||  || — || August 31, 2014 || Haleakala || Pan-STARRS ||  || align=right | 3.6 km || 
|-id=666 bgcolor=#d6d6d6
| 520666 ||  || — || January 27, 2007 || Kitt Peak || Spacewatch ||  || align=right | 2.2 km || 
|-id=667 bgcolor=#E9E9E9
| 520667 ||  || — || October 30, 2005 || Catalina || CSS ||  || align=right | 2.1 km || 
|-id=668 bgcolor=#d6d6d6
| 520668 ||  || — || September 6, 2008 || Mount Lemmon || Mount Lemmon Survey ||  || align=right | 2.3 km || 
|-id=669 bgcolor=#d6d6d6
| 520669 ||  || — || April 22, 2007 || Mount Lemmon || Mount Lemmon Survey ||  || align=right | 3.1 km || 
|-id=670 bgcolor=#d6d6d6
| 520670 ||  || — || March 4, 2012 || Mount Lemmon || Mount Lemmon Survey ||  || align=right | 2.2 km || 
|-id=671 bgcolor=#d6d6d6
| 520671 ||  || — || March 25, 2007 || Mount Lemmon || Mount Lemmon Survey ||  || align=right | 2.9 km || 
|-id=672 bgcolor=#d6d6d6
| 520672 ||  || — || November 13, 2010 || Mount Lemmon || Mount Lemmon Survey ||  || align=right | 3.3 km || 
|-id=673 bgcolor=#d6d6d6
| 520673 ||  || — || April 22, 2007 || Kitt Peak || Spacewatch ||  || align=right | 3.1 km || 
|-id=674 bgcolor=#d6d6d6
| 520674 ||  || — || March 17, 2012 || Mount Lemmon || Mount Lemmon Survey ||  || align=right | 3.0 km || 
|-id=675 bgcolor=#d6d6d6
| 520675 ||  || — || November 10, 2009 || Kitt Peak || Spacewatch ||  || align=right | 2.9 km || 
|-id=676 bgcolor=#d6d6d6
| 520676 ||  || — || September 14, 2009 || Kitt Peak || Spacewatch ||  || align=right | 2.1 km || 
|-id=677 bgcolor=#E9E9E9
| 520677 ||  || — || October 31, 2010 || Mount Lemmon || Mount Lemmon Survey ||  || align=right | 1.4 km || 
|-id=678 bgcolor=#d6d6d6
| 520678 ||  || — || January 13, 2011 || Kitt Peak || Spacewatch ||  || align=right | 2.5 km || 
|-id=679 bgcolor=#d6d6d6
| 520679 ||  || — || March 12, 2007 || Kitt Peak || Spacewatch ||  || align=right | 2.3 km || 
|-id=680 bgcolor=#d6d6d6
| 520680 ||  || — || September 17, 2009 || Mount Lemmon || Mount Lemmon Survey ||  || align=right | 2.5 km || 
|-id=681 bgcolor=#E9E9E9
| 520681 ||  || — || December 29, 2011 || Kitt Peak || Spacewatch ||  || align=right | 2.7 km || 
|-id=682 bgcolor=#d6d6d6
| 520682 ||  || — || April 13, 2013 || Haleakala || Pan-STARRS ||  || align=right | 2.1 km || 
|-id=683 bgcolor=#E9E9E9
| 520683 ||  || — || March 15, 2013 || Mount Lemmon || Mount Lemmon Survey ||  || align=right | 1.7 km || 
|-id=684 bgcolor=#d6d6d6
| 520684 ||  || — || March 23, 2012 || Mount Lemmon || Mount Lemmon Survey ||  || align=right | 2.1 km || 
|-id=685 bgcolor=#d6d6d6
| 520685 ||  || — || February 22, 2007 || Kitt Peak || Spacewatch ||  || align=right | 2.1 km || 
|-id=686 bgcolor=#d6d6d6
| 520686 ||  || — || September 19, 2009 || Kitt Peak || Spacewatch ||  || align=right | 2.4 km || 
|-id=687 bgcolor=#E9E9E9
| 520687 ||  || — || November 11, 2006 || Kitt Peak || Spacewatch ||  || align=right | 1.4 km || 
|-id=688 bgcolor=#d6d6d6
| 520688 ||  || — || August 18, 2009 || Kitt Peak || Spacewatch ||  || align=right | 2.4 km || 
|-id=689 bgcolor=#E9E9E9
| 520689 ||  || — || March 15, 2008 || Kitt Peak || Spacewatch ||  || align=right | 1.5 km || 
|-id=690 bgcolor=#d6d6d6
| 520690 ||  || — || September 29, 2009 || Mount Lemmon || Mount Lemmon Survey ||  || align=right | 3.9 km || 
|-id=691 bgcolor=#d6d6d6
| 520691 ||  || — || March 16, 2012 || Haleakala || Pan-STARRS ||  || align=right | 3.1 km || 
|-id=692 bgcolor=#d6d6d6
| 520692 ||  || — || May 12, 2013 || Haleakala || Pan-STARRS ||  || align=right | 2.6 km || 
|-id=693 bgcolor=#d6d6d6
| 520693 ||  || — || March 12, 2007 || Kitt Peak || Spacewatch ||  || align=right | 1.9 km || 
|-id=694 bgcolor=#d6d6d6
| 520694 ||  || — || January 31, 2006 || Kitt Peak || Spacewatch ||  || align=right | 1.9 km || 
|-id=695 bgcolor=#d6d6d6
| 520695 ||  || — || March 29, 2012 || Haleakala || Pan-STARRS ||  || align=right | 2.8 km || 
|-id=696 bgcolor=#d6d6d6
| 520696 ||  || — || May 13, 2007 || Kitt Peak || Spacewatch ||  || align=right | 2.7 km || 
|-id=697 bgcolor=#d6d6d6
| 520697 ||  || — || August 23, 2014 || Haleakala || Pan-STARRS ||  || align=right | 2.7 km || 
|-id=698 bgcolor=#d6d6d6
| 520698 ||  || — || September 29, 2009 || Mount Lemmon || Mount Lemmon Survey ||  || align=right | 3.4 km || 
|-id=699 bgcolor=#d6d6d6
| 520699 ||  || — || February 28, 2012 || Haleakala || Pan-STARRS ||  || align=right | 2.5 km || 
|-id=700 bgcolor=#d6d6d6
| 520700 ||  || — || September 3, 2008 || Kitt Peak || Spacewatch ||  || align=right | 2.8 km || 
|}

520701–520800 

|-bgcolor=#d6d6d6
| 520701 ||  || — || April 22, 2007 || Kitt Peak || Spacewatch ||  || align=right | 2.4 km || 
|-id=702 bgcolor=#E9E9E9
| 520702 ||  || — || January 3, 2012 || Mount Lemmon || Mount Lemmon Survey ||  || align=right data-sort-value="0.92" | 920 m || 
|-id=703 bgcolor=#d6d6d6
| 520703 ||  || — || January 30, 2011 || Haleakala || Pan-STARRS ||  || align=right | 2.6 km || 
|-id=704 bgcolor=#d6d6d6
| 520704 ||  || — || March 11, 2007 || Kitt Peak || Spacewatch ||  || align=right | 2.8 km || 
|-id=705 bgcolor=#d6d6d6
| 520705 ||  || — || March 16, 2007 || Mount Lemmon || Mount Lemmon Survey ||  || align=right | 2.5 km || 
|-id=706 bgcolor=#E9E9E9
| 520706 ||  || — || March 4, 2008 || Mount Lemmon || Mount Lemmon Survey ||  || align=right data-sort-value="0.91" | 910 m || 
|-id=707 bgcolor=#E9E9E9
| 520707 ||  || — || February 27, 2008 || Kitt Peak || Spacewatch ||  || align=right | 1.6 km || 
|-id=708 bgcolor=#d6d6d6
| 520708 ||  || — || August 25, 2014 || Haleakala || Pan-STARRS ||  || align=right | 2.8 km || 
|-id=709 bgcolor=#d6d6d6
| 520709 ||  || — || February 25, 2011 || Mount Lemmon || Mount Lemmon Survey ||  || align=right | 2.8 km || 
|-id=710 bgcolor=#E9E9E9
| 520710 ||  || — || May 11, 2005 || Kitt Peak || Spacewatch ||  || align=right | 1.2 km || 
|-id=711 bgcolor=#E9E9E9
| 520711 ||  || — || August 26, 2014 || Haleakala || Pan-STARRS ||  || align=right | 2.5 km || 
|-id=712 bgcolor=#E9E9E9
| 520712 ||  || — || May 4, 2009 || Mount Lemmon || Mount Lemmon Survey ||  || align=right data-sort-value="0.78" | 780 m || 
|-id=713 bgcolor=#d6d6d6
| 520713 ||  || — || March 24, 2012 || Kitt Peak || Spacewatch ||  || align=right | 2.4 km || 
|-id=714 bgcolor=#d6d6d6
| 520714 ||  || — || January 13, 2011 || Mount Lemmon || Mount Lemmon Survey ||  || align=right | 2.5 km || 
|-id=715 bgcolor=#d6d6d6
| 520715 ||  || — || March 2, 2006 || Kitt Peak || Spacewatch ||  || align=right | 2.7 km || 
|-id=716 bgcolor=#E9E9E9
| 520716 ||  || — || November 14, 2010 || Kitt Peak || Spacewatch ||  || align=right | 1.8 km || 
|-id=717 bgcolor=#E9E9E9
| 520717 ||  || — || October 27, 2005 || Mount Lemmon || Mount Lemmon Survey ||  || align=right | 1.7 km || 
|-id=718 bgcolor=#d6d6d6
| 520718 ||  || — || March 9, 2011 || Mount Lemmon || Mount Lemmon Survey ||  || align=right | 2.6 km || 
|-id=719 bgcolor=#d6d6d6
| 520719 ||  || — || March 15, 2007 || Mount Lemmon || Mount Lemmon Survey ||  || align=right | 2.8 km || 
|-id=720 bgcolor=#E9E9E9
| 520720 ||  || — || February 10, 2008 || Kitt Peak || Spacewatch ||  || align=right | 1.7 km || 
|-id=721 bgcolor=#E9E9E9
| 520721 ||  || — || October 2, 2010 || Mount Lemmon || Mount Lemmon Survey ||  || align=right | 1.5 km || 
|-id=722 bgcolor=#E9E9E9
| 520722 ||  || — || August 27, 2014 || Haleakala || Pan-STARRS ||  || align=right | 1.7 km || 
|-id=723 bgcolor=#E9E9E9
| 520723 ||  || — || January 17, 2007 || Catalina || CSS ||  || align=right | 2.1 km || 
|-id=724 bgcolor=#E9E9E9
| 520724 ||  || — || November 15, 2006 || Mount Lemmon || Mount Lemmon Survey ||  || align=right | 2.1 km || 
|-id=725 bgcolor=#d6d6d6
| 520725 ||  || — || December 25, 2005 || Kitt Peak || Spacewatch ||  || align=right | 2.5 km || 
|-id=726 bgcolor=#E9E9E9
| 520726 ||  || — || March 6, 2008 || Mount Lemmon || Mount Lemmon Survey ||  || align=right | 1.8 km || 
|-id=727 bgcolor=#E9E9E9
| 520727 ||  || — || December 3, 2010 || Mount Lemmon || Mount Lemmon Survey ||  || align=right | 2.0 km || 
|-id=728 bgcolor=#E9E9E9
| 520728 ||  || — || March 29, 2012 || Haleakala || Pan-STARRS ||  || align=right | 2.2 km || 
|-id=729 bgcolor=#d6d6d6
| 520729 ||  || — || August 30, 2014 || Haleakala || Pan-STARRS ||  || align=right | 2.2 km || 
|-id=730 bgcolor=#d6d6d6
| 520730 ||  || — || August 30, 2014 || Haleakala || Pan-STARRS ||  || align=right | 2.5 km || 
|-id=731 bgcolor=#E9E9E9
| 520731 ||  || — || October 2, 2010 || Mount Lemmon || Mount Lemmon Survey ||  || align=right data-sort-value="0.89" | 890 m || 
|-id=732 bgcolor=#E9E9E9
| 520732 ||  || — || November 12, 2010 || Mount Lemmon || Mount Lemmon Survey ||  || align=right | 1.5 km || 
|-id=733 bgcolor=#E9E9E9
| 520733 ||  || — || December 1, 2006 || Mount Lemmon || Mount Lemmon Survey ||  || align=right | 2.4 km || 
|-id=734 bgcolor=#d6d6d6
| 520734 ||  || — || May 3, 2008 || Mount Lemmon || Mount Lemmon Survey ||  || align=right | 2.3 km || 
|-id=735 bgcolor=#d6d6d6
| 520735 ||  || — || March 13, 2007 || Kitt Peak || Spacewatch ||  || align=right | 2.5 km || 
|-id=736 bgcolor=#d6d6d6
| 520736 ||  || — || February 25, 2011 || Mount Lemmon || Mount Lemmon Survey ||  || align=right | 2.6 km || 
|-id=737 bgcolor=#d6d6d6
| 520737 ||  || — || July 29, 2008 || Kitt Peak || Spacewatch ||  || align=right | 2.6 km || 
|-id=738 bgcolor=#fefefe
| 520738 ||  || — || August 31, 2014 || Haleakala || Pan-STARRS ||  || align=right data-sort-value="0.97" | 970 m || 
|-id=739 bgcolor=#d6d6d6
| 520739 ||  || — || August 31, 2014 || Haleakala || Pan-STARRS ||  || align=right | 2.7 km || 
|-id=740 bgcolor=#d6d6d6
| 520740 ||  || — || August 28, 2009 || Kitt Peak || Spacewatch ||  || align=right | 2.4 km || 
|-id=741 bgcolor=#d6d6d6
| 520741 ||  || — || April 29, 2012 || Kitt Peak || Spacewatch ||  || align=right | 2.9 km || 
|-id=742 bgcolor=#d6d6d6
| 520742 ||  || — || November 26, 2009 || Kitt Peak || Spacewatch ||  || align=right | 2.7 km || 
|-id=743 bgcolor=#d6d6d6
| 520743 ||  || — || March 27, 2012 || Kitt Peak || Spacewatch || Tj (2.99) || align=right | 2.9 km || 
|-id=744 bgcolor=#d6d6d6
| 520744 ||  || — || September 22, 2009 || Mount Lemmon || Mount Lemmon Survey ||  || align=right | 2.2 km || 
|-id=745 bgcolor=#d6d6d6
| 520745 ||  || — || December 27, 2005 || Kitt Peak || Spacewatch ||  || align=right | 2.2 km || 
|-id=746 bgcolor=#E9E9E9
| 520746 ||  || — || December 16, 2006 || Mount Lemmon || Mount Lemmon Survey ||  || align=right | 1.4 km || 
|-id=747 bgcolor=#d6d6d6
| 520747 ||  || — || September 15, 2009 || Kitt Peak || Spacewatch ||  || align=right | 2.5 km || 
|-id=748 bgcolor=#d6d6d6
| 520748 ||  || — || January 29, 2011 || Mount Lemmon || Mount Lemmon Survey ||  || align=right | 2.2 km || 
|-id=749 bgcolor=#d6d6d6
| 520749 ||  || — || December 5, 2010 || Mount Lemmon || Mount Lemmon Survey ||  || align=right | 3.2 km || 
|-id=750 bgcolor=#d6d6d6
| 520750 ||  || — || August 23, 2008 || Siding Spring || SSS ||  || align=right | 2.5 km || 
|-id=751 bgcolor=#E9E9E9
| 520751 ||  || — || August 31, 2014 || Catalina || CSS ||  || align=right | 1.9 km || 
|-id=752 bgcolor=#d6d6d6
| 520752 ||  || — || March 24, 2012 || Kitt Peak || Spacewatch ||  || align=right | 2.6 km || 
|-id=753 bgcolor=#E9E9E9
| 520753 ||  || — || October 11, 2010 || Mount Lemmon || Mount Lemmon Survey ||  || align=right | 2.5 km || 
|-id=754 bgcolor=#E9E9E9
| 520754 ||  || — || August 18, 2009 || Kitt Peak || Spacewatch ||  || align=right | 2.2 km || 
|-id=755 bgcolor=#d6d6d6
| 520755 ||  || — || December 6, 2010 || Mount Lemmon || Mount Lemmon Survey ||  || align=right | 2.6 km || 
|-id=756 bgcolor=#d6d6d6
| 520756 ||  || — || September 22, 2009 || Catalina || CSS ||  || align=right | 3.6 km || 
|-id=757 bgcolor=#d6d6d6
| 520757 ||  || — || August 24, 2008 || Kitt Peak || Spacewatch ||  || align=right | 2.4 km || 
|-id=758 bgcolor=#d6d6d6
| 520758 ||  || — || April 21, 2012 || Haleakala || Pan-STARRS ||  || align=right | 3.0 km || 
|-id=759 bgcolor=#d6d6d6
| 520759 ||  || — || November 10, 2009 || Kitt Peak || Spacewatch ||  || align=right | 3.1 km || 
|-id=760 bgcolor=#d6d6d6
| 520760 ||  || — || August 9, 2013 || Haleakala || Pan-STARRS ||  || align=right | 2.7 km || 
|-id=761 bgcolor=#d6d6d6
| 520761 ||  || — || March 22, 2012 || Mount Lemmon || Mount Lemmon Survey ||  || align=right | 2.7 km || 
|-id=762 bgcolor=#fefefe
| 520762 ||  || — || March 14, 2012 || Haleakala || Pan-STARRS ||  || align=right | 1.2 km || 
|-id=763 bgcolor=#E9E9E9
| 520763 ||  || — || August 29, 2005 || Kitt Peak || Spacewatch ||  || align=right | 2.4 km || 
|-id=764 bgcolor=#d6d6d6
| 520764 ||  || — || August 29, 2014 || Mount Lemmon || Mount Lemmon Survey ||  || align=right | 2.7 km || 
|-id=765 bgcolor=#E9E9E9
| 520765 ||  || — || October 25, 2005 || Kitt Peak || Spacewatch ||  || align=right | 2.0 km || 
|-id=766 bgcolor=#d6d6d6
| 520766 ||  || — || December 19, 2009 || Kitt Peak || Spacewatch ||  || align=right | 2.8 km || 
|-id=767 bgcolor=#d6d6d6
| 520767 ||  || — || February 25, 2006 || Kitt Peak || Spacewatch ||  || align=right | 2.3 km || 
|-id=768 bgcolor=#d6d6d6
| 520768 ||  || — || September 24, 2009 || Mount Lemmon || Mount Lemmon Survey ||  || align=right | 2.6 km || 
|-id=769 bgcolor=#d6d6d6
| 520769 ||  || — || August 7, 2008 || Kitt Peak || Spacewatch ||  || align=right | 2.4 km || 
|-id=770 bgcolor=#d6d6d6
| 520770 ||  || — || February 26, 2012 || Mount Lemmon || Mount Lemmon Survey ||  || align=right | 3.1 km || 
|-id=771 bgcolor=#d6d6d6
| 520771 ||  || — || March 25, 2012 || Mount Lemmon || Mount Lemmon Survey ||  || align=right | 2.5 km || 
|-id=772 bgcolor=#d6d6d6
| 520772 ||  || — || October 25, 2009 || Kitt Peak || Spacewatch ||  || align=right | 2.3 km || 
|-id=773 bgcolor=#fefefe
| 520773 ||  || — || October 23, 2008 || Kitt Peak || Spacewatch ||  || align=right data-sort-value="0.67" | 670 m || 
|-id=774 bgcolor=#d6d6d6
| 520774 ||  || — || October 24, 2003 || Kitt Peak || Spacewatch ||  || align=right | 3.1 km || 
|-id=775 bgcolor=#d6d6d6
| 520775 ||  || — || September 29, 2008 || Catalina || CSS ||  || align=right | 3.7 km || 
|-id=776 bgcolor=#d6d6d6
| 520776 ||  || — || January 14, 2011 || Mount Lemmon || Mount Lemmon Survey ||  || align=right | 2.4 km || 
|-id=777 bgcolor=#d6d6d6
| 520777 ||  || — || February 7, 2011 || Mount Lemmon || Mount Lemmon Survey ||  || align=right | 2.8 km || 
|-id=778 bgcolor=#d6d6d6
| 520778 ||  || — || June 18, 2013 || Haleakala || Pan-STARRS ||  || align=right | 2.7 km || 
|-id=779 bgcolor=#d6d6d6
| 520779 ||  || — || October 29, 2003 || Kitt Peak || Spacewatch ||  || align=right | 3.1 km || 
|-id=780 bgcolor=#E9E9E9
| 520780 ||  || — || May 29, 2009 || Mount Lemmon || Mount Lemmon Survey ||  || align=right | 1.8 km || 
|-id=781 bgcolor=#E9E9E9
| 520781 ||  || — || October 20, 2006 || Kitt Peak || Spacewatch ||  || align=right data-sort-value="0.85" | 850 m || 
|-id=782 bgcolor=#d6d6d6
| 520782 ||  || — || March 27, 2012 || Kitt Peak || Spacewatch ||  || align=right | 2.7 km || 
|-id=783 bgcolor=#d6d6d6
| 520783 ||  || — || June 30, 2013 || Haleakala || Pan-STARRS ||  || align=right | 2.5 km || 
|-id=784 bgcolor=#E9E9E9
| 520784 ||  || — || September 18, 2014 || Haleakala || Pan-STARRS ||  || align=right | 2.3 km || 
|-id=785 bgcolor=#d6d6d6
| 520785 ||  || — || July 2, 2013 || Haleakala || Pan-STARRS ||  || align=right | 2.7 km || 
|-id=786 bgcolor=#E9E9E9
| 520786 ||  || — || May 8, 2008 || Kitt Peak || Spacewatch ||  || align=right | 1.5 km || 
|-id=787 bgcolor=#E9E9E9
| 520787 ||  || — || April 6, 2008 || Mount Lemmon || Mount Lemmon Survey ||  || align=right | 1.3 km || 
|-id=788 bgcolor=#d6d6d6
| 520788 ||  || — || November 22, 2009 || Kitt Peak || Spacewatch ||  || align=right | 2.6 km || 
|-id=789 bgcolor=#d6d6d6
| 520789 ||  || — || November 30, 2005 || Kitt Peak || Spacewatch ||  || align=right | 1.8 km || 
|-id=790 bgcolor=#d6d6d6
| 520790 ||  || — || April 1, 2012 || Mount Lemmon || Mount Lemmon Survey ||  || align=right | 3.2 km || 
|-id=791 bgcolor=#E9E9E9
| 520791 ||  || — || October 25, 2005 || Kitt Peak || Spacewatch ||  || align=right | 2.2 km || 
|-id=792 bgcolor=#E9E9E9
| 520792 ||  || — || September 23, 2005 || Kitt Peak || Spacewatch ||  || align=right | 2.4 km || 
|-id=793 bgcolor=#d6d6d6
| 520793 ||  || — || December 8, 2005 || Kitt Peak || Spacewatch ||  || align=right | 2.4 km || 
|-id=794 bgcolor=#E9E9E9
| 520794 ||  || — || November 1, 2010 || Catalina || CSS ||  || align=right | 1.1 km || 
|-id=795 bgcolor=#d6d6d6
| 520795 ||  || — || January 30, 2011 || Haleakala || Pan-STARRS ||  || align=right | 2.1 km || 
|-id=796 bgcolor=#d6d6d6
| 520796 ||  || — || September 20, 2014 || Haleakala || Pan-STARRS ||  || align=right | 2.4 km || 
|-id=797 bgcolor=#d6d6d6
| 520797 ||  || — || July 30, 2008 || Mount Lemmon || Mount Lemmon Survey ||  || align=right | 2.6 km || 
|-id=798 bgcolor=#E9E9E9
| 520798 ||  || — || December 2, 2010 || Mount Lemmon || Mount Lemmon Survey ||  || align=right | 2.0 km || 
|-id=799 bgcolor=#d6d6d6
| 520799 ||  || — || June 18, 2013 || Haleakala || Pan-STARRS ||  || align=right | 2.9 km || 
|-id=800 bgcolor=#E9E9E9
| 520800 ||  || — || March 22, 2012 || Catalina || CSS ||  || align=right | 3.1 km || 
|}

520801–520900 

|-bgcolor=#E9E9E9
| 520801 ||  || — || October 25, 2005 || Catalina || CSS ||  || align=right | 2.8 km || 
|-id=802 bgcolor=#E9E9E9
| 520802 ||  || — || November 12, 2010 || Mount Lemmon || Mount Lemmon Survey ||  || align=right | 1.4 km || 
|-id=803 bgcolor=#E9E9E9
| 520803 ||  || — || November 17, 2006 || Kitt Peak || Spacewatch ||  || align=right | 1.6 km || 
|-id=804 bgcolor=#E9E9E9
| 520804 ||  || — || November 18, 2006 || Kitt Peak || Spacewatch ||  || align=right | 1.6 km || 
|-id=805 bgcolor=#d6d6d6
| 520805 ||  || — || November 19, 2003 || Kitt Peak || Spacewatch ||  || align=right | 3.7 km || 
|-id=806 bgcolor=#d6d6d6
| 520806 ||  || — || September 21, 2008 || Mount Lemmon || Mount Lemmon Survey ||  || align=right | 2.3 km || 
|-id=807 bgcolor=#d6d6d6
| 520807 ||  || — || December 28, 2005 || Kitt Peak || Spacewatch ||  || align=right | 2.3 km || 
|-id=808 bgcolor=#FFC2E0
| 520808 ||  || — || October 5, 2014 || WISE || WISE || APO || align=right data-sort-value="0.7" | 700 m || 
|-id=809 bgcolor=#d6d6d6
| 520809 ||  || — || October 3, 2014 || Haleakala || Pan-STARRS ||  || align=right | 3.4 km || 
|-id=810 bgcolor=#d6d6d6
| 520810 ||  || — || September 6, 2008 || Kitt Peak || Spacewatch ||  || align=right | 3.2 km || 
|-id=811 bgcolor=#fefefe
| 520811 ||  || — || February 3, 2009 || Kitt Peak || Spacewatch ||  || align=right data-sort-value="0.94" | 940 m || 
|-id=812 bgcolor=#d6d6d6
| 520812 ||  || — || March 27, 2011 || Kitt Peak || Spacewatch ||  || align=right | 3.1 km || 
|-id=813 bgcolor=#d6d6d6
| 520813 ||  || — || October 18, 2009 || Mount Lemmon || Mount Lemmon Survey ||  || align=right | 2.4 km || 
|-id=814 bgcolor=#d6d6d6
| 520814 ||  || — || September 4, 2008 || Kitt Peak || Spacewatch ||  || align=right | 2.6 km || 
|-id=815 bgcolor=#d6d6d6
| 520815 ||  || — || July 15, 2013 || Haleakala || Pan-STARRS ||  || align=right | 3.4 km || 
|-id=816 bgcolor=#d6d6d6
| 520816 ||  || — || September 21, 2009 || Kitt Peak || Spacewatch ||  || align=right | 2.1 km || 
|-id=817 bgcolor=#E9E9E9
| 520817 ||  || — || July 12, 2013 || Haleakala || Pan-STARRS ||  || align=right | 1.4 km || 
|-id=818 bgcolor=#E9E9E9
| 520818 ||  || — || October 3, 2014 || Kitt Peak || Spacewatch ||  || align=right | 2.1 km || 
|-id=819 bgcolor=#d6d6d6
| 520819 ||  || — || March 2, 2011 || Kitt Peak || Spacewatch ||  || align=right | 2.8 km || 
|-id=820 bgcolor=#E9E9E9
| 520820 ||  || — || November 17, 2006 || Kitt Peak || Spacewatch ||  || align=right | 1.3 km || 
|-id=821 bgcolor=#d6d6d6
| 520821 ||  || — || September 2, 2008 || Kitt Peak || Spacewatch ||  || align=right | 2.0 km || 
|-id=822 bgcolor=#d6d6d6
| 520822 ||  || — || December 16, 2003 || Kitt Peak || Spacewatch ||  || align=right | 4.9 km || 
|-id=823 bgcolor=#E9E9E9
| 520823 ||  || — || September 26, 2014 || Catalina || CSS ||  || align=right | 1.3 km || 
|-id=824 bgcolor=#d6d6d6
| 520824 ||  || — || June 1, 2013 || Haleakala || Pan-STARRS ||  || align=right | 3.3 km || 
|-id=825 bgcolor=#d6d6d6
| 520825 ||  || — || September 27, 2003 || Anderson Mesa || LONEOS ||  || align=right | 3.3 km || 
|-id=826 bgcolor=#d6d6d6
| 520826 ||  || — || September 18, 2014 || Haleakala || Pan-STARRS ||  || align=right | 3.0 km || 
|-id=827 bgcolor=#d6d6d6
| 520827 ||  || — || March 1, 2010 || WISE || WISE ||  || align=right | 4.1 km || 
|-id=828 bgcolor=#d6d6d6
| 520828 ||  || — || October 1, 2003 || Kitt Peak || Spacewatch ||  || align=right | 2.8 km || 
|-id=829 bgcolor=#d6d6d6
| 520829 ||  || — || March 2, 2006 || Kitt Peak || Spacewatch ||  || align=right | 2.5 km || 
|-id=830 bgcolor=#d6d6d6
| 520830 ||  || — || September 28, 2008 || Mount Lemmon || Mount Lemmon Survey ||  || align=right | 2.3 km || 
|-id=831 bgcolor=#d6d6d6
| 520831 ||  || — || October 21, 2014 || Mount Lemmon || Mount Lemmon Survey ||  || align=right | 2.0 km || 
|-id=832 bgcolor=#d6d6d6
| 520832 ||  || — || December 19, 2009 || Mount Lemmon || Mount Lemmon Survey ||  || align=right | 1.9 km || 
|-id=833 bgcolor=#E9E9E9
| 520833 ||  || — || March 11, 2007 || Kitt Peak || Spacewatch ||  || align=right | 2.0 km || 
|-id=834 bgcolor=#E9E9E9
| 520834 ||  || — || November 14, 2006 || Kitt Peak || Spacewatch ||  || align=right data-sort-value="0.92" | 920 m || 
|-id=835 bgcolor=#d6d6d6
| 520835 ||  || — || November 24, 2009 || Kitt Peak || Spacewatch ||  || align=right | 2.1 km || 
|-id=836 bgcolor=#E9E9E9
| 520836 ||  || — || August 18, 2009 || Kitt Peak || Spacewatch ||  || align=right | 1.8 km || 
|-id=837 bgcolor=#d6d6d6
| 520837 ||  || — || September 4, 2008 || Kitt Peak || Spacewatch ||  || align=right | 2.2 km || 
|-id=838 bgcolor=#E9E9E9
| 520838 ||  || — || November 12, 2010 || Mount Lemmon || Mount Lemmon Survey ||  || align=right data-sort-value="0.87" | 870 m || 
|-id=839 bgcolor=#d6d6d6
| 520839 ||  || — || November 22, 2009 || Kitt Peak || Spacewatch ||  || align=right | 2.2 km || 
|-id=840 bgcolor=#d6d6d6
| 520840 ||  || — || October 25, 2014 || Haleakala || Pan-STARRS ||  || align=right | 2.7 km || 
|-id=841 bgcolor=#fefefe
| 520841 ||  || — || October 26, 2014 || Mount Lemmon || Mount Lemmon Survey ||  || align=right data-sort-value="0.73" | 730 m || 
|-id=842 bgcolor=#fefefe
| 520842 ||  || — || December 30, 2011 || Kitt Peak || Spacewatch ||  || align=right data-sort-value="0.58" | 580 m || 
|-id=843 bgcolor=#d6d6d6
| 520843 ||  || — || October 28, 2014 || Haleakala || Pan-STARRS ||  || align=right | 2.9 km || 
|-id=844 bgcolor=#d6d6d6
| 520844 ||  || — || March 26, 2011 || Mount Lemmon || Mount Lemmon Survey ||  || align=right | 2.8 km || 
|-id=845 bgcolor=#E9E9E9
| 520845 ||  || — || February 25, 2007 || Mount Lemmon || Mount Lemmon Survey ||  || align=right | 1.7 km || 
|-id=846 bgcolor=#E9E9E9
| 520846 ||  || — || January 16, 2007 || Catalina || CSS ||  || align=right | 1.2 km || 
|-id=847 bgcolor=#d6d6d6
| 520847 ||  || — || July 16, 2013 || Haleakala || Pan-STARRS ||  || align=right | 2.4 km || 
|-id=848 bgcolor=#E9E9E9
| 520848 ||  || — || July 28, 2009 || Kitt Peak || Spacewatch ||  || align=right | 1.5 km || 
|-id=849 bgcolor=#d6d6d6
| 520849 ||  || — || June 20, 2013 || Haleakala || Pan-STARRS ||  || align=right | 3.2 km || 
|-id=850 bgcolor=#d6d6d6
| 520850 ||  || — || December 19, 2003 || Kitt Peak || Spacewatch ||  || align=right | 3.6 km || 
|-id=851 bgcolor=#E9E9E9
| 520851 ||  || — || February 11, 2011 || Mount Lemmon || Mount Lemmon Survey ||  || align=right | 2.4 km || 
|-id=852 bgcolor=#d6d6d6
| 520852 ||  || — || January 30, 2011 || Haleakala || Pan-STARRS ||  || align=right | 2.7 km || 
|-id=853 bgcolor=#d6d6d6
| 520853 ||  || — || October 29, 2014 || Haleakala || Pan-STARRS ||  || align=right | 3.6 km || 
|-id=854 bgcolor=#d6d6d6
| 520854 ||  || — || February 24, 2010 || WISE || WISE ||  || align=right | 2.3 km || 
|-id=855 bgcolor=#E9E9E9
| 520855 ||  || — || January 14, 2011 || Mount Lemmon || Mount Lemmon Survey ||  || align=right | 2.5 km || 
|-id=856 bgcolor=#d6d6d6
| 520856 ||  || — || October 30, 2014 || Haleakala || Pan-STARRS ||  || align=right | 2.7 km || 
|-id=857 bgcolor=#d6d6d6
| 520857 ||  || — || January 30, 2011 || Haleakala || Pan-STARRS ||  || align=right | 2.8 km || 
|-id=858 bgcolor=#fefefe
| 520858 ||  || — || October 1, 2010 || Kitt Peak || Spacewatch ||  || align=right data-sort-value="0.60" | 600 m || 
|-id=859 bgcolor=#d6d6d6
| 520859 ||  || — || November 23, 1997 || Kitt Peak || Spacewatch ||  || align=right | 3.1 km || 
|-id=860 bgcolor=#d6d6d6
| 520860 ||  || — || November 30, 2003 || Kitt Peak || Spacewatch ||  || align=right | 3.1 km || 
|-id=861 bgcolor=#E9E9E9
| 520861 ||  || — || October 27, 2005 || Catalina || CSS ||  || align=right | 2.9 km || 
|-id=862 bgcolor=#FFC2E0
| 520862 ||  || — || October 3, 2014 || Haleakala || Pan-STARRS || AMO || align=right data-sort-value="0.25" | 250 m || 
|-id=863 bgcolor=#E9E9E9
| 520863 ||  || — || November 10, 2010 || Haleakala || Pan-STARRS ||  || align=right | 1.2 km || 
|-id=864 bgcolor=#d6d6d6
| 520864 ||  || — || April 29, 2012 || Mount Lemmon || Mount Lemmon Survey ||  || align=right | 2.0 km || 
|-id=865 bgcolor=#d6d6d6
| 520865 ||  || — || June 22, 2007 || Kitt Peak || Spacewatch ||  || align=right | 2.9 km || 
|-id=866 bgcolor=#d6d6d6
| 520866 ||  || — || September 20, 2014 || Haleakala || Pan-STARRS ||  || align=right | 2.9 km || 
|-id=867 bgcolor=#d6d6d6
| 520867 ||  || — || September 18, 2009 || Kitt Peak || Spacewatch ||  || align=right | 2.6 km || 
|-id=868 bgcolor=#d6d6d6
| 520868 ||  || — || November 16, 2014 || Mount Lemmon || Mount Lemmon Survey ||  || align=right | 3.4 km || 
|-id=869 bgcolor=#E9E9E9
| 520869 ||  || — || July 16, 2013 || Haleakala || Pan-STARRS ||  || align=right | 2.8 km || 
|-id=870 bgcolor=#d6d6d6
| 520870 ||  || — || April 7, 2007 || Mount Lemmon || Mount Lemmon Survey ||  || align=right | 2.5 km || 
|-id=871 bgcolor=#E9E9E9
| 520871 ||  || — || October 30, 2005 || Kitt Peak || Spacewatch ||  || align=right | 2.0 km || 
|-id=872 bgcolor=#d6d6d6
| 520872 ||  || — || October 16, 2009 || Catalina || CSS ||  || align=right | 3.7 km || 
|-id=873 bgcolor=#d6d6d6
| 520873 ||  || — || April 25, 2007 || Mount Lemmon || Mount Lemmon Survey ||  || align=right | 2.8 km || 
|-id=874 bgcolor=#E9E9E9
| 520874 ||  || — || November 16, 2006 || Kitt Peak || Spacewatch ||  || align=right | 1.7 km || 
|-id=875 bgcolor=#E9E9E9
| 520875 ||  || — || September 17, 2009 || Mount Lemmon || Mount Lemmon Survey ||  || align=right | 1.5 km || 
|-id=876 bgcolor=#d6d6d6
| 520876 ||  || — || May 18, 2012 || Mount Lemmon || Mount Lemmon Survey ||  || align=right | 3.4 km || 
|-id=877 bgcolor=#d6d6d6
| 520877 ||  || — || October 18, 2009 || Mount Lemmon || Mount Lemmon Survey ||  || align=right | 1.7 km || 
|-id=878 bgcolor=#d6d6d6
| 520878 ||  || — || September 6, 2014 || Mount Lemmon || Mount Lemmon Survey ||  || align=right | 3.1 km || 
|-id=879 bgcolor=#d6d6d6
| 520879 ||  || — || May 21, 2012 || Haleakala || Pan-STARRS ||  || align=right | 3.6 km || 
|-id=880 bgcolor=#E9E9E9
| 520880 ||  || — || September 29, 2005 || Kitt Peak || Spacewatch ||  || align=right | 1.6 km || 
|-id=881 bgcolor=#fefefe
| 520881 ||  || — || February 28, 2012 || Haleakala || Pan-STARRS ||  || align=right data-sort-value="0.64" | 640 m || 
|-id=882 bgcolor=#d6d6d6
| 520882 ||  || — || December 16, 2009 || Mount Lemmon || Mount Lemmon Survey || Tj (2.97) || align=right | 3.6 km || 
|-id=883 bgcolor=#E9E9E9
| 520883 ||  || — || June 18, 2013 || Haleakala || Pan-STARRS ||  || align=right | 1.8 km || 
|-id=884 bgcolor=#E9E9E9
| 520884 ||  || — || March 16, 2007 || Mount Lemmon || Mount Lemmon Survey ||  || align=right | 1.5 km || 
|-id=885 bgcolor=#d6d6d6
| 520885 ||  || — || January 30, 2011 || Haleakala || Pan-STARRS ||  || align=right | 1.9 km || 
|-id=886 bgcolor=#fefefe
| 520886 ||  || — || March 17, 2012 || Mount Lemmon || Mount Lemmon Survey ||  || align=right data-sort-value="0.62" | 620 m || 
|-id=887 bgcolor=#E9E9E9
| 520887 ||  || — || December 13, 2006 || Kitt Peak || Spacewatch ||  || align=right | 1.2 km || 
|-id=888 bgcolor=#E9E9E9
| 520888 ||  || — || October 14, 2010 || Mount Lemmon || Mount Lemmon Survey ||  || align=right | 1.1 km || 
|-id=889 bgcolor=#fefefe
| 520889 ||  || — || October 12, 2007 || Kitt Peak || Spacewatch ||  || align=right data-sort-value="0.61" | 610 m || 
|-id=890 bgcolor=#E9E9E9
| 520890 ||  || — || November 20, 2014 || Haleakala || Pan-STARRS ||  || align=right | 1.8 km || 
|-id=891 bgcolor=#E9E9E9
| 520891 ||  || — || January 28, 2011 || Mount Lemmon || Mount Lemmon Survey ||  || align=right | 2.1 km || 
|-id=892 bgcolor=#d6d6d6
| 520892 ||  || — || November 20, 2014 || Haleakala || Pan-STARRS ||  || align=right | 2.6 km || 
|-id=893 bgcolor=#E9E9E9
| 520893 ||  || — || August 9, 2013 || Haleakala || Pan-STARRS ||  || align=right | 1.3 km || 
|-id=894 bgcolor=#fefefe
| 520894 ||  || — || October 13, 2010 || Mount Lemmon || Mount Lemmon Survey ||  || align=right data-sort-value="0.71" | 710 m || 
|-id=895 bgcolor=#d6d6d6
| 520895 ||  || — || August 23, 2007 || Siding Spring || SSS ||  || align=right | 4.0 km || 
|-id=896 bgcolor=#fefefe
| 520896 ||  || — || February 9, 2005 || Kitt Peak || Spacewatch ||  || align=right data-sort-value="0.65" | 650 m || 
|-id=897 bgcolor=#d6d6d6
| 520897 ||  || — || November 19, 2008 || Kitt Peak || Spacewatch ||  || align=right | 2.9 km || 
|-id=898 bgcolor=#d6d6d6
| 520898 ||  || — || April 29, 2011 || Mount Lemmon || Mount Lemmon Survey ||  || align=right | 2.8 km || 
|-id=899 bgcolor=#E9E9E9
| 520899 ||  || — || August 9, 2013 || Kitt Peak || Spacewatch ||  || align=right data-sort-value="0.90" | 900 m || 
|-id=900 bgcolor=#fefefe
| 520900 ||  || — || February 7, 2008 || Kitt Peak || Spacewatch ||  || align=right data-sort-value="0.66" | 660 m || 
|}

520901–521000 

|-bgcolor=#E9E9E9
| 520901 ||  || — || October 15, 2009 || Mount Lemmon || Mount Lemmon Survey ||  || align=right | 1.5 km || 
|-id=902 bgcolor=#d6d6d6
| 520902 ||  || — || October 13, 2013 || Kitt Peak || Spacewatch ||  || align=right | 2.8 km || 
|-id=903 bgcolor=#E9E9E9
| 520903 ||  || — || August 9, 2013 || Kitt Peak || Spacewatch ||  || align=right data-sort-value="0.85" | 850 m || 
|-id=904 bgcolor=#E9E9E9
| 520904 ||  || — || July 14, 2013 || Haleakala || Pan-STARRS ||  || align=right | 1.8 km || 
|-id=905 bgcolor=#d6d6d6
| 520905 ||  || — || September 22, 2008 || Kitt Peak || Spacewatch ||  || align=right | 2.5 km || 
|-id=906 bgcolor=#E9E9E9
| 520906 ||  || — || March 16, 2007 || Kitt Peak || Spacewatch ||  || align=right | 1.4 km || 
|-id=907 bgcolor=#d6d6d6
| 520907 ||  || — || July 14, 2013 || Haleakala || Pan-STARRS ||  || align=right | 1.9 km || 
|-id=908 bgcolor=#fefefe
| 520908 ||  || — || January 14, 2008 || Kitt Peak || Spacewatch ||  || align=right data-sort-value="0.56" | 560 m || 
|-id=909 bgcolor=#d6d6d6
| 520909 ||  || — || October 7, 2013 || Kitt Peak || Spacewatch ||  || align=right | 3.1 km || 
|-id=910 bgcolor=#E9E9E9
| 520910 ||  || — || October 10, 2008 || Mount Lemmon || Mount Lemmon Survey ||  || align=right | 3.1 km || 
|-id=911 bgcolor=#E9E9E9
| 520911 ||  || — || November 24, 2014 || Mount Lemmon || Mount Lemmon Survey ||  || align=right | 2.3 km || 
|-id=912 bgcolor=#E9E9E9
| 520912 ||  || — || November 24, 2014 || Mount Lemmon || Mount Lemmon Survey ||  || align=right data-sort-value="0.96" | 960 m || 
|-id=913 bgcolor=#E9E9E9
| 520913 ||  || — || August 18, 2009 || Kitt Peak || Spacewatch ||  || align=right | 1.4 km || 
|-id=914 bgcolor=#E9E9E9
| 520914 ||  || — || March 31, 2011 || Kitt Peak || Spacewatch ||  || align=right | 1.9 km || 
|-id=915 bgcolor=#d6d6d6
| 520915 ||  || — || November 26, 2014 || Haleakala || Pan-STARRS ||  || align=right | 3.6 km || 
|-id=916 bgcolor=#E9E9E9
| 520916 ||  || — || May 3, 2008 || Kitt Peak || Spacewatch ||  || align=right data-sort-value="0.86" | 860 m || 
|-id=917 bgcolor=#E9E9E9
| 520917 ||  || — || April 11, 2003 || Kitt Peak || Spacewatch ||  || align=right | 1.7 km || 
|-id=918 bgcolor=#d6d6d6
| 520918 ||  || — || November 18, 2008 || Kitt Peak || Spacewatch ||  || align=right | 2.6 km || 
|-id=919 bgcolor=#fefefe
| 520919 ||  || — || November 26, 2014 || Haleakala || Pan-STARRS ||  || align=right data-sort-value="0.88" | 880 m || 
|-id=920 bgcolor=#d6d6d6
| 520920 ||  || — || February 10, 2010 || Kitt Peak || Spacewatch ||  || align=right | 2.7 km || 
|-id=921 bgcolor=#d6d6d6
| 520921 ||  || — || November 1, 2008 || Mount Lemmon || Mount Lemmon Survey ||  || align=right | 2.5 km || 
|-id=922 bgcolor=#d6d6d6
| 520922 ||  || — || September 25, 2008 || Kitt Peak || Spacewatch ||  || align=right | 2.3 km || 
|-id=923 bgcolor=#d6d6d6
| 520923 ||  || — || December 7, 2013 || Mount Lemmon || Mount Lemmon Survey ||  || align=right | 3.3 km || 
|-id=924 bgcolor=#E9E9E9
| 520924 ||  || — || April 13, 2011 || Haleakala || Pan-STARRS ||  || align=right | 2.6 km || 
|-id=925 bgcolor=#d6d6d6
| 520925 ||  || — || February 14, 2005 || Kitt Peak || Spacewatch ||  || align=right | 3.0 km || 
|-id=926 bgcolor=#E9E9E9
| 520926 ||  || — || January 30, 2011 || Haleakala || Pan-STARRS ||  || align=right data-sort-value="0.94" | 940 m || 
|-id=927 bgcolor=#fefefe
| 520927 ||  || — || October 12, 2010 || Mount Lemmon || Mount Lemmon Survey ||  || align=right data-sort-value="0.62" | 620 m || 
|-id=928 bgcolor=#E9E9E9
| 520928 ||  || — || October 24, 2009 || Kitt Peak || Spacewatch ||  || align=right | 1.7 km || 
|-id=929 bgcolor=#fefefe
| 520929 ||  || — || September 15, 2009 || Mount Lemmon || Mount Lemmon Survey ||  || align=right | 1.2 km || 
|-id=930 bgcolor=#d6d6d6
| 520930 ||  || — || October 25, 2008 || Kitt Peak || Spacewatch ||  || align=right | 3.1 km || 
|-id=931 bgcolor=#d6d6d6
| 520931 ||  || — || January 30, 2010 || WISE || WISE ||  || align=right | 3.4 km || 
|-id=932 bgcolor=#d6d6d6
| 520932 ||  || — || March 11, 2005 || Mount Lemmon || Mount Lemmon Survey ||  || align=right | 2.6 km || 
|-id=933 bgcolor=#d6d6d6
| 520933 ||  || — || December 25, 2009 || Kitt Peak || Spacewatch ||  || align=right | 3.0 km || 
|-id=934 bgcolor=#d6d6d6
| 520934 ||  || — || October 22, 2008 || Kitt Peak || Spacewatch ||  || align=right | 2.5 km || 
|-id=935 bgcolor=#fefefe
| 520935 ||  || — || March 1, 2008 || Kitt Peak || Spacewatch ||  || align=right data-sort-value="0.95" | 950 m || 
|-id=936 bgcolor=#E9E9E9
| 520936 ||  || — || December 20, 2009 || Mount Lemmon || Mount Lemmon Survey ||  || align=right | 1.4 km || 
|-id=937 bgcolor=#E9E9E9
| 520937 ||  || — || June 15, 2004 || Kitt Peak || Spacewatch ||  || align=right | 1.2 km || 
|-id=938 bgcolor=#E9E9E9
| 520938 ||  || — || January 27, 2011 || Catalina || CSS ||  || align=right | 1.3 km || 
|-id=939 bgcolor=#d6d6d6
| 520939 ||  || — || June 3, 2011 || Mount Lemmon || Mount Lemmon Survey ||  || align=right | 2.9 km || 
|-id=940 bgcolor=#E9E9E9
| 520940 ||  || — || March 26, 2011 || Kitt Peak || Spacewatch ||  || align=right | 1.5 km || 
|-id=941 bgcolor=#d6d6d6
| 520941 ||  || — || September 3, 2013 || Haleakala || Pan-STARRS ||  || align=right | 3.5 km || 
|-id=942 bgcolor=#E9E9E9
| 520942 ||  || — || April 9, 2008 || Mount Lemmon || Mount Lemmon Survey ||  || align=right data-sort-value="0.86" | 860 m || 
|-id=943 bgcolor=#fefefe
| 520943 ||  || — || April 21, 2009 || Mount Lemmon || Mount Lemmon Survey ||  || align=right data-sort-value="0.90" | 900 m || 
|-id=944 bgcolor=#d6d6d6
| 520944 ||  || — || April 22, 2007 || Kitt Peak || Spacewatch ||  || align=right | 2.9 km || 
|-id=945 bgcolor=#fefefe
| 520945 ||  || — || December 2, 2014 || Haleakala || Pan-STARRS || H || align=right data-sort-value="0.67" | 670 m || 
|-id=946 bgcolor=#FA8072
| 520946 ||  || — || April 4, 2013 || Haleakala || Pan-STARRS || H || align=right data-sort-value="0.43" | 430 m || 
|-id=947 bgcolor=#d6d6d6
| 520947 ||  || — || March 16, 2010 || Mount Lemmon || Mount Lemmon Survey ||  || align=right | 2.8 km || 
|-id=948 bgcolor=#fefefe
| 520948 ||  || — || December 20, 2014 || Haleakala || Pan-STARRS || H || align=right data-sort-value="0.56" | 560 m || 
|-id=949 bgcolor=#d6d6d6
| 520949 ||  || — || October 26, 2013 || Kitt Peak || Spacewatch || 7:4 || align=right | 4.0 km || 
|-id=950 bgcolor=#E9E9E9
| 520950 ||  || — || March 9, 2007 || Kitt Peak || Spacewatch ||  || align=right | 1.1 km || 
|-id=951 bgcolor=#d6d6d6
| 520951 ||  || — || September 29, 2008 || Kitt Peak || Spacewatch ||  || align=right | 2.2 km || 
|-id=952 bgcolor=#d6d6d6
| 520952 ||  || — || December 21, 2014 || Mount Lemmon || Mount Lemmon Survey ||  || align=right | 2.4 km || 
|-id=953 bgcolor=#fefefe
| 520953 ||  || — || January 14, 2011 || Mount Lemmon || Mount Lemmon Survey ||  || align=right data-sort-value="0.76" | 760 m || 
|-id=954 bgcolor=#fefefe
| 520954 ||  || — || March 16, 2012 || Kitt Peak || Spacewatch ||  || align=right data-sort-value="0.75" | 750 m || 
|-id=955 bgcolor=#E9E9E9
| 520955 ||  || — || January 28, 2007 || Kitt Peak || Spacewatch ||  || align=right | 1.6 km || 
|-id=956 bgcolor=#E9E9E9
| 520956 ||  || — || September 14, 2013 || Haleakala || Pan-STARRS ||  || align=right | 1.7 km || 
|-id=957 bgcolor=#E9E9E9
| 520957 ||  || — || September 15, 2013 || Mount Lemmon || Mount Lemmon Survey ||  || align=right | 1.2 km || 
|-id=958 bgcolor=#E9E9E9
| 520958 ||  || — || February 25, 2011 || Kitt Peak || Spacewatch ||  || align=right | 2.1 km || 
|-id=959 bgcolor=#fefefe
| 520959 ||  || — || December 1, 2010 || Mount Lemmon || Mount Lemmon Survey ||  || align=right data-sort-value="0.70" | 700 m || 
|-id=960 bgcolor=#E9E9E9
| 520960 ||  || — || January 30, 2011 || Haleakala || Pan-STARRS ||  || align=right | 1.6 km || 
|-id=961 bgcolor=#d6d6d6
| 520961 ||  || — || September 2, 2008 || Kitt Peak || Spacewatch ||  || align=right | 1.8 km || 
|-id=962 bgcolor=#d6d6d6
| 520962 ||  || — || September 30, 2013 || Mount Lemmon || Mount Lemmon Survey ||  || align=right | 2.3 km || 
|-id=963 bgcolor=#E9E9E9
| 520963 ||  || — || January 28, 2006 || Mount Lemmon || Mount Lemmon Survey ||  || align=right | 1.7 km || 
|-id=964 bgcolor=#E9E9E9
| 520964 ||  || — || April 11, 2007 || Catalina || CSS ||  || align=right | 1.7 km || 
|-id=965 bgcolor=#E9E9E9
| 520965 ||  || — || September 29, 2009 || Mount Lemmon || Mount Lemmon Survey ||  || align=right | 1.4 km || 
|-id=966 bgcolor=#E9E9E9
| 520966 ||  || — || April 29, 2012 || Kitt Peak || Spacewatch ||  || align=right | 2.2 km || 
|-id=967 bgcolor=#d6d6d6
| 520967 ||  || — || September 11, 2007 || Kitt Peak || Spacewatch ||  || align=right | 2.7 km || 
|-id=968 bgcolor=#E9E9E9
| 520968 ||  || — || August 28, 2013 || Catalina || CSS ||  || align=right | 2.7 km || 
|-id=969 bgcolor=#d6d6d6
| 520969 ||  || — || May 26, 2010 || WISE || WISE ||  || align=right | 3.0 km || 
|-id=970 bgcolor=#E9E9E9
| 520970 ||  || — || December 29, 2014 || Haleakala || Pan-STARRS ||  || align=right | 1.1 km || 
|-id=971 bgcolor=#fefefe
| 520971 ||  || — || May 13, 2008 || Mount Lemmon || Mount Lemmon Survey ||  || align=right | 1.1 km || 
|-id=972 bgcolor=#E9E9E9
| 520972 ||  || — || March 13, 2007 || Mount Lemmon || Mount Lemmon Survey ||  || align=right | 1.3 km || 
|-id=973 bgcolor=#d6d6d6
| 520973 ||  || — || September 19, 2006 || Kitt Peak || Spacewatch ||  || align=right | 3.2 km || 
|-id=974 bgcolor=#fefefe
| 520974 ||  || — || November 1, 2013 || Mount Lemmon || Mount Lemmon Survey ||  || align=right data-sort-value="0.87" | 870 m || 
|-id=975 bgcolor=#fefefe
| 520975 ||  || — || October 9, 2010 || Mount Lemmon || Mount Lemmon Survey ||  || align=right data-sort-value="0.71" | 710 m || 
|-id=976 bgcolor=#d6d6d6
| 520976 ||  || — || November 23, 2014 || Haleakala || Pan-STARRS || Tj (2.99) || align=right | 3.7 km || 
|-id=977 bgcolor=#d6d6d6
| 520977 ||  || — || December 18, 2009 || Kitt Peak || Spacewatch || Tj (2.96) || align=right | 3.4 km || 
|-id=978 bgcolor=#d6d6d6
| 520978 ||  || — || September 13, 2004 || Kitt Peak || Spacewatch || 3:2 || align=right | 5.2 km || 
|-id=979 bgcolor=#E9E9E9
| 520979 ||  || — || February 8, 2011 || Catalina || CSS ||  || align=right | 1.8 km || 
|-id=980 bgcolor=#E9E9E9
| 520980 ||  || — || September 3, 2008 || Kitt Peak || Spacewatch ||  || align=right | 1.6 km || 
|-id=981 bgcolor=#E9E9E9
| 520981 ||  || — || January 26, 2006 || Catalina || CSS ||  || align=right | 2.0 km || 
|-id=982 bgcolor=#E9E9E9
| 520982 ||  || — || March 26, 2011 || Mount Lemmon || Mount Lemmon Survey ||  || align=right | 1.9 km || 
|-id=983 bgcolor=#fefefe
| 520983 ||  || — || April 30, 2008 || Kitt Peak || Spacewatch ||  || align=right data-sort-value="0.90" | 900 m || 
|-id=984 bgcolor=#fefefe
| 520984 ||  || — || May 13, 2012 || Mount Lemmon || Mount Lemmon Survey ||  || align=right data-sort-value="0.65" | 650 m || 
|-id=985 bgcolor=#d6d6d6
| 520985 ||  || — || July 28, 2012 || Haleakala || Pan-STARRS ||  || align=right | 2.4 km || 
|-id=986 bgcolor=#E9E9E9
| 520986 ||  || — || January 10, 2002 || Cima Ekar || ADAS ||  || align=right | 1.7 km || 
|-id=987 bgcolor=#d6d6d6
| 520987 ||  || — || September 15, 2007 || Kitt Peak || Spacewatch ||  || align=right | 2.6 km || 
|-id=988 bgcolor=#d6d6d6
| 520988 ||  || — || October 20, 2008 || Mount Lemmon || Mount Lemmon Survey ||  || align=right | 1.8 km || 
|-id=989 bgcolor=#E9E9E9
| 520989 ||  || — || September 5, 2008 || Kitt Peak || Spacewatch ||  || align=right | 2.0 km || 
|-id=990 bgcolor=#E9E9E9
| 520990 ||  || — || April 1, 2011 || Kitt Peak || Spacewatch ||  || align=right | 1.7 km || 
|-id=991 bgcolor=#E9E9E9
| 520991 ||  || — || November 9, 2013 || Mount Lemmon || Mount Lemmon Survey ||  || align=right data-sort-value="0.94" | 940 m || 
|-id=992 bgcolor=#fefefe
| 520992 ||  || — || December 17, 2009 || Kitt Peak || Spacewatch || H || align=right data-sort-value="0.64" | 640 m || 
|-id=993 bgcolor=#fefefe
| 520993 ||  || — || January 19, 2015 || Haleakala || Pan-STARRS || H || align=right data-sort-value="0.64" | 640 m || 
|-id=994 bgcolor=#fefefe
| 520994 ||  || — || June 9, 2013 || Haleakala || Pan-STARRS || H || align=right data-sort-value="0.50" | 500 m || 
|-id=995 bgcolor=#E9E9E9
| 520995 ||  || — || September 3, 2008 || Kitt Peak || Spacewatch ||  || align=right | 2.1 km || 
|-id=996 bgcolor=#E9E9E9
| 520996 ||  || — || September 14, 2013 || Kitt Peak || Spacewatch ||  || align=right | 1.8 km || 
|-id=997 bgcolor=#fefefe
| 520997 ||  || — || January 28, 2015 || Haleakala || Pan-STARRS || H || align=right data-sort-value="0.72" | 720 m || 
|-id=998 bgcolor=#fefefe
| 520998 ||  || — || August 24, 2011 || Haleakala || Pan-STARRS || H || align=right data-sort-value="0.54" | 540 m || 
|-id=999 bgcolor=#fefefe
| 520999 ||  || — || November 28, 2011 || Haleakala || Pan-STARRS || H || align=right data-sort-value="0.77" | 770 m || 
|-id=000 bgcolor=#fefefe
| 521000 ||  || — || August 8, 2013 || Haleakala || Pan-STARRS || H || align=right data-sort-value="0.71" | 710 m || 
|}

References

External links 
 Discovery Circumstances: Numbered Minor Planets (520001)–(525000) (IAU Minor Planet Center)

0520